= 2026 Baltimore Ravens season =

31st season in franchise history

- Owner: Steve Bisciotti
- General manager: Eric DeCosta
- President: Sashi Brown
- Head coach: Jesse Minter
- Offensive coordinator: Declan Doyle
- Defensive coordinator: Anthony Weaver
- Home stadium: M&T Bank Stadium

Results
- Record: 4–7
- Division place: 4th AFC North

Uniform
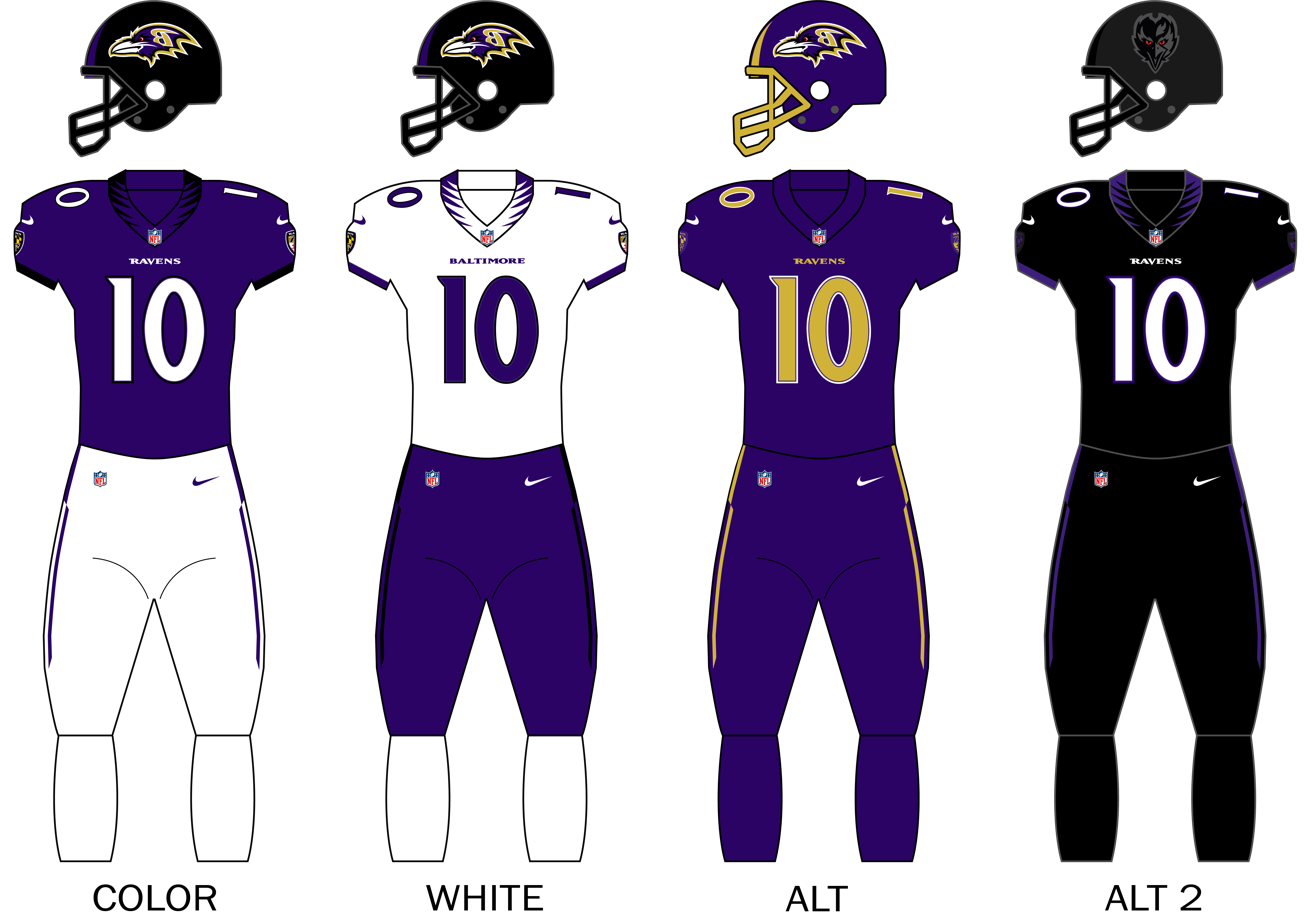

The 2026 season is the Baltimore Ravens' 31st in the National Football League (NFL), their eighth under general manager Eric DeCosta and their first season under head coach Jesse Minter. The Ravens will look to improve upon their 8–9 record from 2025, return to the playoffs after a one year absence and reclaim the AFC North title.

This is the first season since 2007 without longtime head coach John Harbaugh, as Harbaugh was dismissed on January 6, 2026. Jesse Minter was eventually hired as the fourth head coach in franchise history; Minter had coached with the team between 2017 and 2020. The Ravens unveiled new uniforms on April 16.

They started 4–1, but they would lose 6 games in a row afterwards, thanks to Lamar Jackson spraining his ankle in the Ravens' 24–18 win over the Titans at halftime in Week 4, and then got hurt again four weeks later, this time injuring his thumb, on the first snap of their 10–36 loss to the Buffalo Bills. They also gave the Los Angeles Chargers their first win of the season after starting 0–8, losing to them 23–20 in Week 10.

This is also the first season since 2016 without either tight end Isaiah Likely, fullback Patrick Ricard, offensive lineman Daniel Faalele, punter Jordan Stout, or safety Ar'Darius Washington, as they joined Harbaugh, who became the head coach for the New York Giants.

== Offseason ==
=== Free agents ===
Position	Player	Tag	2026 team	Contract
CB	Chidobe Awuzie	UFA	Baltimore Ravens	1 year, $5 million
DE	Taven Bryan	UFA		
OG	Daniel Faalele	UFA	New York Giants	1 year, $1.4 million
FS	Alohi Gilman	UFA	Kansas City Chiefs	3 years, $24 million
WR	DeAndre Hopkins	UFA		
ILB	Jake Hummel	UFA	Houston Texans	2 years, $4.75 million
QB	Tyler Huntley	UFA	Baltimore Ravens	2 years, $11 million
DT	John Jenkins	UFA	Baltimore Ravens	1 year, $2.1 million
OLB	Dre'Mont Jones	UFA	New England Patriots	3 years, $36.5 million
TE	Charlie Kolar	UFA	Los Angeles Chargers	3 years, 24.3 million
TE	Isaiah Likely	UFA	New York Giants	3 years, $40 million
C	Tyler Linderbaum	UFA	Las Vegas Raiders	3 years, $81 million
RB	Keaton Mitchell	RFA	Los Angeles Chargers	2 years, $9.25 million
LS	Nick Moore	UFA	Baltimore Ravens	4 years, $1.1 million
OT	Joseph Noteboom	UFA		
OLB	David Ojabo	UFA	Miami Dolphins	1 year, $1.4 million
FB	Patrick Ricard	UFA	New York Giants	2 years, $8.5 million
P	Jordan Stout	UFA	New York Giants	3 years, $12.3 million
DT	Brent Urban	UFA		
NT	C.J. Okoye	EFRA	Baltimore Ravens	1 year, $1 million
OLB	Kyle Van Noy	UFA	Minnesota Vikings	1 year, $2.8 million
C	Corey Bullock	EFRA	Baltimore Ravens	1 year, $1 million
WR	Tylan Wallace	UFA	Cleveland Browns	1 year, $1.4 million
WR	Dayton Wade	ERFA	Baltimore Ravens	1 year, $885,000
ILB	Carl Jones Jr.	EFRA	Baltimore Ravens	1 year, $1 million
FS	Ar'Darius Washington	UFA	New York Giants	1 year, $3 million

=== Signings ===
Position	Player	Previous team	Date signed	Contract
OG	John Simpson	New York Jets	March 9, 2026	3 year, $30 million
DE	Trey Hendrickson	Cincinnati Bengals	March 11, 2026	4 year, $112 million
S	Jaylinn Hawkins	New England Patriots	March 11, 2026	2 year, $10 million
TE	Durham Smythe	Chicago Bears	March 11, 2026	1 year, $3 million
C	Jovaughn Gwyn	Atlanta Falcons	March 12, 2026	1 year, $1.2 million
C	Danny Pinter	Indianapolis Colts	March 17, 2026	1 year, $2.75 million
DE	Calais Campbell	Arizona Cardinals	April 30, 2026	1 year, $5.5 million
QB	Skylar Thompson	Pittsburgh Steelers	May 4, 2026	1 year, $1.14 million
S	K'Von Wallace	Houston Texans	May 11, 2026	1 year, $1.22 million
C	Ethan Pocic	Cleveland Browns	July 17, 2026	1 year, $4.5 million

=== Players lost ===
Position	Player	Reason	2026 team	Date
QB	Cooper Rush	Released	Atlanta Falcons	March 12, 2026

=== Extensions ===
Below are players who are under contract through 2026 and received a contract extension.

Position	Player	Date signed	Notes
WR	Zay Flowers	August 4, 2026	4 years, $140 million

== Draft ==
2026 Baltimore Ravens draft selections
Round	Selection	Player	Position	College	Notes
1	14	Vega Ioane	OG	Penn State	
2	45	Zion Young	OLB	Missouri	
3	80	Ja'Kobi Lane	WR	USC	
4	115	Elijah Sarratt	WR	Indiana	
4	133	Matthew Hibner	TE	SMU	From 49ers (Note: The Ravens traded the 154th overall selection and a 2027 sixth-round selection for the 133rd overall selection.)
5	142	Traded to the Tennessee Titans (Note: The Ravens traded a 2026 fifth-round selection to the Tennessee Titans in exchange for OLB Dre'Mont Jones.)			From Jets (Note: The Ravens traded a 2025 fifth-round and a 2026 sixth-round selection to the New York Jets in exchange for a 2025 sixth-round and 2026 fifth-round selection.)
5	154	Traded to the San Francisco 49ers			
5	162	Chandler Rivers	CB	Duke	From Chargers (Note: The Ravens traded a 2027 seventh-round selection and OLB Odafe Oweh to the Los Angeles Chargers in exchange for a fifth-round selection and S Alohi Gilman.)
5	173	Josh Cuevas	TE	Alabama	Compensatory selection
5	174	Adam Randall	RB	Clemson	Compensatory selection
6	194	Traded to the New York Jets			
6	211	Ryan Eckley	P	Michigan State	From Eagles (Note: The Ravens traded CB Jaire Alexander and a 2027 seventh-round selection to the Philadelphia Eagles in exchange for a sixth-round selection.)
7	232	Traded to the Los Angeles Rams (Note: The Ravens traded a seventh-round selection to the Los Angeles Rams in exchange for a CB Tre'Davious White and a 2027 seventh-round selection.)			
7	250	Rayshaun Benny	DT	Michigan	Compensatory selection
7	253	Evan Beerntsen	OG	Northwestern	Compensatory selection

Draft trades

2026 Baltimore Ravens undrafted free agents
Name	Position	College	Ref.
Cortez Braham	WR	Memphis	
Ethan Burke	OLB	Texas	
Nick Dawkins	C	Penn State	
Dominic DeLuca	ILB	Penn State	
Joe Fagnano	QB	UConn	
Aaron Graves	DT	Iowa	
Matthew McDoom	CB	Cincinnati	
Dontae McMillan	RB	Eastern Michigan	
Diego Pavia	QB	Vanderbilt	
Tyler Pezza	TE	Brown	
Diego Pounds	OT	Ole Miss	
Jahquez Robinson	S	Auburn	
Octavian Smith Jr.	WR	Maryland	
Trevonte Sylvester	OT	Louisville	
Elijah Tau-Tolliver	RB	Michigan State	
Silas Walters	S	Miami (OH)	
Lardarius Webb Jr.	CB	Wake Forest	
Reid Williford	ILB	Charlotte	
Dion Wilson Jr.	DT	Syracuse	

== Staff ==
=== Coaching changes ===
2026 Baltimore Ravens staff changes
Coach	Position	Reason left	Replacement	Ref.
John Harbaugh	Head coach	Dismissed	Jesse Minter	
Todd Monken	Offensive coordinator	Accepted job with Cleveland Browns	Declan Doyle	
Zach Orr	Defensive coordinator	Dismissed	Anthony Weaver	
Chris Horton	Special teams coordinator	Accepted job with New York Giants	Anthony Levine Sr.	
Tee Martin	Quarterbacks coach	Dismissed	Israel Woolfork	
Willie Taggart	Running backs coach	Accepted job with New York Giants	Eddie Faulkner	
Greg Lewis	Wide receivers coach	Accepted job with Tennessee Titans	Keary Colbert	
George Godsey	Tight end coach	Accepted job with Georgia Tech	Zach Grossi	
Travis Switzer	Run game coordinator	Accepted job with Cleveland Browns	Dwayne Ledford	
George Warhop	Offensive line coach	Accepted job with Cleveland Browns	Dwayne Ledford	
Dennis Johnson	Defensive line coach	Accepted job with New York Giants	Lou Esposito	
Matt Robinson	Outside linebackers coach	Accepted job with Las Vegas Raiders	Harland Bower	
Donald D'Alesio	Defensive backs coach	Accepted job with New York Giants	Mike Mickens	

Baltimore Ravens staff
Front office: Owner – Steve Bisciotti; President – Sashi Brown; Executive vice president/general manager – Eric DeCosta; Executive vice president – Ozzie Newsome; Vice president of football operations – Nick Matteo; Vice president of player personnel – George Kokinis; Vice president of football science – David McDonald; Director of player personnel – Mark Azevedo; Assistant director of player personnel – Andrew Raphael; Assistant director of player personnel – Bobby Vega; Director of college scouting – Joey Cleary; Director of pro personnel – Corey Frazier; Director of football innovation – Steve Clagett; Director of data and decision science – Derrick Yam; Assistant director of football administration - Sophia Cortese; Director of football systems – James Oncea; Senior director of football information – Megan McLaughlin; Consultant – Pat Moriarty; Chief of staff to the head coach – Christina Deruyter; Head coaches: Head coach – Jesse Minter; Offensive coaches: Offensive coordinator – Declan Doyle; Pass game coordinator – Marcus Brady; Quarterbacks – Israel Woolfork; Running backs – Eddie Faulkner; Wide receivers – Keary Colbert; Assistant wide receivers – Prentice Gill; Tight ends – Zack Grossi; Offensive line/run game coordinator – Dwayne Ledford; Assistant offensive line – Shawn Flaherty; Senior offensive assistant – Joe Lombardi; Offensive quality control – Patrick Kramer	Defensive coaches: Defensive coordinator – Anthony Weaver; Defensive line – Lou Esposito; Outside linebackers – Harland Bower; Inside linebackers – Tyler Santucci; Assistant linebackers – Matt O'Donnell; Pass game coordinator/secondary – Mike Mickens; Safeties – P. J. Volker; Assistant defensive backs – Miles Taylor; Football analyst – Rick Minter; Game management coordinator/defensive assistant – Charlie Gelman; Defensive quality control – Andrew Rogan; Special teams coaches: Special teams coordinator – Anthony Levine Sr.; Senior special teams coach – Randy Brown; Senior assistant special teams coach – Ben Kotwica; Coaching research: Coaching research engineer – Ben Davis; Strength and conditioning: Strength and conditioning coordinator – Scott Elliott; Assistant strength and conditioning – Kaelyn Buskey; Assistant strength and conditioning – Kevin Hartman; Strength and conditioning – Ron Shrift; Strength and conditioning – Anthony Watson; Applied sports science – Connor Gorny; Director of high performance – Sam Rosengarten; → Coaching staff → Front office → More NFL staffs

== Current roster ==
Baltimore Ravens roster
Quarterbacks (QB): 11 Jacoby Brissett; 12 Joe Fagnano; 18 Kedon Slovis; Running backs (RB): 26 Rasheen Ali; 22 Derrick Henry; 43 Justice Hill; 23 Adam Randall; Wide receivers (WR): 7 Rashod Bateman; 4 Zay Flowers; 6 Ja'Kobi Lane; 13 Elijah Sarratt; 81 Devontez Walker; 10 LaJohntay Wester RS; Tight ends (TE): 89 Mark Andrews; 85 Josh Cuevas; 88 Matthew Hibner	Offensive linemen (OL): 62 Chuma Edoga T; 71 Vega Ioane G; 51 Emery Jones Jr. G/T; 58 Ryan Neuzil C; 64 Cam Jurgens C; 70 Roger Rosengarten T; 74 John Simpson G; 79 Ronnie Stanley T; 76 Carson Vinson T; Defensive linemen (DL): 93 Calais Campbell; 94 John Jenkins; 98 Travis Jones; 92 Nnamdi Madubuike; 90 Aeneas Peebles; 96 Broderick Washington	Linebackers (LB): 40 Teddye Buchanan ILB; 97 Ethan Burke OLB; 15 Mike Green OLB; 91 Trey Hendrickson OLB; 49 Jay Higgins ILB; 32 Trenton Simpson ILB; 0 Roquan Smith ILB; 9 Zion Young OLB; Defensive backs (DB): 3 Chidobe Awuzie CB; 14 Kyle Hamilton S; 21 Jaylinn Hawkins S; 44 Marlon Humphrey CB; 39 Keondre Jackson S; 38 Keyon Martin CB; 29 Chandler Rivers CB; 24 Malaki Starks S; 27 T. J. Tampa CB; 25 K'Von Wallace S; 2 Nate Wiggins CB; Special teams (ST): 30 Ryan Eckley P; 35 Riley Patterson K; 46 Nick Moore LS	Practice squad: 68 A. J. Arcuri G; 99 Rayshaun Benny DT; 78 Gerad Christian-Lichtenhan T (PS/I); 60 Kyle Hergel C; 50 Adisa Isaac OLB; 36 Rayshawn Jenkins S; 48 Carl Jones Jr. ILB; 67 Michael Jordan G; 82 Gage Larvadain WR; 17 Chris Moore WR; 65 David Olajiga DE (IPP); 28 Amani Oruwariye CB; 84 Ty Pezza TE; 56 Kaimon Rucker OLB; 47 Lucas Scott FB; 87 Nick Vannett TE; 34 Lardarius Webb Jr. CB; Reserve: 54 Jovaughn Gwyn C (IR); 5 Tyler Huntley QB (IR); 8 Lamar Jackson QB (IR); 31 Bilhal Kone CB (IR/DFR); 33 Tyler Loop K (IR); 63 Danny Pinter C (IR); 77 Ethan Pocic C (IR); 41 Jahquez Robinson S (IR); 95 Tavius Robinson OLB (IR); 80 Durham Smythe TE (IR); 11 Skylar Thompson QB (IR) 53 active, 15 practice squad (2 IPP), 11 reserve As of November 19, 2026. Rookies in italics.; Roster; Depth chart; Transactions

=== Trades ===
2026 Baltimore Ravens trades
Team	Received	Compensation	Date
New York Giants	2028 NFL draft 7th round selection	DT C.J. Okoye	August 29
Kansas City Chiefs	2028 NFL draft 6th round selection	OT Diego Pounds	August 29
Philadelphia Eagles	C Cam Jurgens; 2027 NFL draft 7th round selection	2027 NFL draft 5th round selection 2028 NFL draft 2nd round selection	October 7
Arizona Cardinals	QB Jacoby Brissett; 2027 NFL draft 5th round selection	2027 NFL draft 4th round selection 2028 NFL draft 7th round selection	November 6
Atlanta Falcons	C Ryan Neuzil	OG Andrew Vorhees; 2028 NFL draft 6th round selection	November 10

==== Maxx Crosby canceled trade ====
On March 7, 2026, the Las Vegas Raiders agreed to trade DE Maxx Crosby in exchange for the Ravens' first-round selections in the 2026 and 2027 NFL draft before the NFL's new year on March 11. However, three days later, the Ravens backed out of the agreement after Crosby failed his physical, at which point the Ravens announced a deal for former Cincinnati Bengals player Trey Hendrickson.

== Preseason ==
Week	Date	Opponent	Result	Record	Venue	Recap
1	August 15	Philadelphia Eagles	W 24–7	1–0	M&T Bank Stadium	Recap
2	August 22	at Minnesota Vikings	W 13–3	2–0	U.S. Bank Stadium	Recap
3	August 28	Washington Commanders	W 41–3	3–0	M&T Bank Stadium	Recap

== Regular season ==
=== Schedule ===
Week	Date	Time (ET)	Opponent	Result	Record	Venue	Network	Recap
1	September 13	1:00 p.m.	at Indianapolis Colts	**W** 41–23	1–0	Lucas Oil Stadium	CBS	Recap
2	September 20	1:00 p.m.	New Orleans Saints	**L** 17–24	1–1	M&T Bank Stadium	CBS	Recap
3	September 27	4:25 p.m.	at Dallas Cowboys	**W** 34–31	2–1	(Brazil) Maracanã Stadium (Rio de Janeiro)	CBS	Recap
4	October 4	1:00 p.m.	Tennessee Titans	**W** 24–18	3–1	M&T Bank Stadium	CBS	Recap
5	October 11	8:20 p.m.	at Atlanta Falcons	**W** 30–23 (OT)	4–1	Mercedes-Benz Stadium	NBC	Recap
6	October 18	1:00 p.m.	at **Cleveland Browns**	**L** 10–13	4–2	Huntington Bank Field	Fox	Recap
7	October 25	1:00 p.m.	**Cincinnati Bengals**	**L** 13–35	4–3	M&T Bank Stadium	CBS	Recap
8	November 1	1:00 p.m.	at Buffalo Bills	**L** 10–36	4–4	Highmark Stadium	CBS	Recap
9	November 5	8:15 p.m.	Jacksonville Jaguars	**L** 10–33	4–5	M&T Bank Stadium	Prime Video	Recap
10	November 16	8:15 p.m.	Los Angeles Chargers	**L** 20–23	4–6	M&T Bank Stadium	ESPN	Recap
11	November 22	1:00 p.m.	at Carolina Panthers	**L** 33–35	4–7	Bank of America Stadium	Fox	Recap
12	November 29	1:00 p.m.	at Houston Texans			Reliant Stadium	CBS	
13	Bye							
14	December 13	1:00 p.m.	Tampa Bay Buccaneers			M&T Bank Stadium	Fox	
15	December 20	1:00 p.m.	at **Pittsburgh Steelers**			Acrisure Stadium	CBS	
16	December 27	1:00 p.m.	**Cleveland Browns**			M&T Bank Stadium	CBS	
17	December 31	8:15 p.m.	at **Cincinnati Bengals**			Paycor Stadium	Prime Video	
18	January 9/10	TBD	**Pittsburgh Steelers**			M&T Bank Stadium	TBD	

Notes

- Intra-division opponents are in **bold** text.
- Networks, dates and times from Weeks 14–17 are subject to change as a result of flexible scheduling.
- The date, time and network for Week 18 will be finalized at the end of Week 17.

=== Game summaries ===
==== Week 1: Baltimore Ravens 41, Indianapolis Colts 23 ====
Week 1: Baltimore Ravens at Indianapolis Colts – Game summary

Quarter	1	2	3	4	Total
**Ravens**	14	17	0	10	**41**
Colts	6	7	3	7	**23**

at Lucas Oil Stadium, Indianapolis, Indiana

- Date: September 13
- Game time: 1:00 p.m. EDT
- Game weather: None (retractable roof closed)
- Game attendance: 65,045
- Referee: Scott Novak
- TV announcers (CBS): Andrew Catalon, Logan Ryan and AJ Ross
- Recap, Game Book

Game information

**First quarter**

- IND – Jonathan Taylor 1-yard run (kick failed), 10:33. Colts 6–0. **Drive: 9 plays, 65 yards, 4:27.**
- BAL – Lamar Jackson 5-yard run (Tyler Loop kick), 8:20. Ravens 7–6. **Drive: 3 plays, 51 yards, 2:13.**
- BAL – Derrick Henry 4-yard run (Tyler Loop kick), 4:05. Ravens 14–6. **Drive: 6 plays, 31 yards, 3:27.**

**Second quarter**

- BAL – Zay Flowers 54-yard pass from Lamar Jackson (Tyler Loop kick), 6:54. Ravens 21–6. **Drive: 5 plays, 66 yards, 2:17.**
- BAL – Derrick Henry 32-yard run (Tyler Loop kick), 5:04. Ravens 28–6. **Drive: 3 plays, 47 yards, 1:34.**
- IND – Jonathan Taylor 3-yard run (Spencer Shrader kick), 2:16. Ravens 28–13. **Drive: 4 plays, 15 yards, 2:11.**
- BAL – Tyler Loop 57-yard field goal, 0:00. Ravens 31–13. **Drive: 6 plays, 37 yards, 0:52.**

**Third quarter**

- IND – Spencer Shrader 58-yard field goal, 7:55. Ravens 31–16. **Drive: 9 plays, 45 yards, 4:55.**

**Fourth quarter**

- BAL – Derrick Henry 3-yard run (Tyler Loop kick), 12:46. Ravens 38–16. **Drive: 6 plays, 77 yards, 3:29.**
- IND – Tyler Warren 9-yard pass from Daniel Jones (Spencer Shrader kick), 6:54. Ravens 38–23. **Drive: 6 plays, 74 yards, 2:20.**
- BAL – Tyler Loop 45-yard field goal, 4:09. Ravens 41–23. **Drive: 10 plays, 43 yards, 6:17.**

**Top passers**

- BAL – Lamar Jackson – 17/25, 324 yards, TD
- IND – Daniel Jones – 19/31, 166 yards, TD, INT

**Top rushers**

- BAL – Derrick Henry – 24 rushes, 144 yards, 3 TD
- IND – Jonathan Taylor – 19 rushes, 98 yards, 2 TD

**Top receivers**

- BAL – Zay Flowers – 5 receptions, 150 yards, TD
- IND – Alec Pierce – 4 receptions, 61 yards

For the first time in Ravens history, they had a 300-yard passer (Lamar Jackson), a 150-yard receiver (Zay Flowers) and a 100-yard rusher (Derrick Henry) in the same game. Henry passed Marcus Allen for third most rushing touchdowns in NFL history with his 124th.

==== Week 2: New Orleans Saints 24, Baltimore Ravens 17 ====
Week 2: New Orleans Saints at Baltimore Ravens – Game summary

Quarter	1	2	3	4	Total
**Saints**	0	6	3	15	**24**
Ravens	7	7	3	0	**17**

at M&T Bank Stadium, Baltimore, Maryland

- Date: September 20
- Game time: 1:00 p.m. EDT
- Game weather: Cloudy, 77 °F (25 °C)
- Game attendance: 70,437
- Referee: Clete Blakeman
- TV announcers (CBS): Spero Dedes, Adam Archuleta and Aditi Kinkhabwala
- Recap, Game Book

Game information

**First quarter**

- BAL – Derrick Henry 1-yard run (Tyler Loop kick), 2:52. Ravens 7–0. **Drive: 12 plays, 76 yards, 6:51.**

**Second quarter**

- NO – Daniel Carlson 23-yard field goal, 3:46. Ravens 7–3. **Drive: 12 plays, 56 yards, 6:24.**
- BAL – Rashod Bateman 22-yard pass from Lamar Jackson (Tyler Loop kick), 0:24. Ravens 14–3. **Drive: 10 plays, 80 yards, 3:22.**
- NO – Daniel Carlson 47-yard field goal, 0:00. Ravens 14–6. **Drive: 4 plays, 15 yards, 0:24.**

**Third quarter**

- NO – Daniel Carlson 51-yard field goal, 11:00. Ravens 14–9. **Drive: 8 plays, 41 yards, 4:00.**
- BAL – Tyler Loop 49-yard field goal, 3:23. Ravens 17–9. **Drive: 14 plays, 37 yards, 7:37.**

**Fourth quarter**

- NO – Chris Olave 21-yard pass from Tyler Shough (Travis Etienne run), 9:42. Tied 17–17. **Drive: 9 plays, 68 yards, 5:18.**
- NO – Tyler Shough 1-yard run (Daniel Carlson kick), 1:28. Saints 24–17. **Drive: 16 plays, 68 yards, 6:38.**

**Top passers**

- NO – Tyler Shough – 27/34, 252 yards, TD
- BAL – Lamar Jackson – 21/31, 235 yards, TD, INT

**Top rushers**

- NO – Travis Etienne – 8 rushes, 25 yards
- BAL – Derrick Henry – 16 rushes, 68 yards, TD

**Top receivers**

- NO – Chris Olave – 8 receptions, 86 yards, TD
- BAL – Rashod Bateman – 7 receptions, 88 yards, TD

Despite leading 17–9 at the end of the third quarter, the Ravens were outscored 15–0 in the fourth resulting in a 24–17 loss.

==== Week 3: Baltimore Ravens 34, Dallas Cowboys 31 ====
NFL Brazil games

Week 3: Baltimore Ravens at Dallas Cowboys – Game summary

Quarter	1	2	3	4	Total
**Ravens**	7	10	7	10	**34**
Cowboys	10	3	8	10	**31**

at Maracanã Stadium, Rio de Janeiro, Brazil

- Date: September 27
- Game time: 5:25 p.m. BRT/4:25 p.m. EDT
- Game weather: Overcast, 77 °F (25 °C)
- Game attendance: 72,792
- Referee: John Hussey
- TV announcers (CBS): Jim Nantz, J. J. Watt and Tracy Wolfson
- Recap, Game Book

Game information

**First quarter**

- DAL – Brandon Aubrey 28-yard field goal, 8:10. Cowboys 3–0. **Drive: 11 plays, 57 yards, 5:17.**
- DAL – Javonte Williams 2-yard run (Brandon Aubrey kick), 4:32. Cowboys 10–0. **Drive: 5 plays, 30 yards, 1:34.**
- BAL – Derrick Henry 4-yard run (Tyler Loop kick), 1:18. Cowboys 10–7. **Drive: 6 plays, 60 yards, 3:14.**

**Second quarter**

- BAL – Derrick Henry 3-yard run (Tyler Loop kick), 11:23. Ravens 14–10. **Drive: 6 plays, 89 yards, 3:30.**
- BAL – Tyler Loop 27-yard field goal, 4:45. Ravens 17–10. **Drive: 9 plays, 34 yards, 4:34.**
- DAL – Brandon Aubrey 38-yard field goal, 0:18. Ravens 17–13. **Drive: 11 plays, 45 yards, 4:26.**

**Third quarter**

- BAL – Chris Moore 4-yard pass from Lamar Jackson (Tyler Loop kick), 3:44. Ravens 24–13. **Drive: 4 plays, 51 yards, 2:10.**
- DAL – Jake Ferguson 19-yard pass from Dak Prescott (Dak Prescott-CeeDee lamb pass), 1:48. Ravens 24–21. **Drive: 6 plays, 67 yards, 1:56.**

**Fourth quarter**

- DAL – KaVontae Turpin 9-yard run (Brandon Aubrey kick), 9:42. Cowboys 28–24. **Drive: 7 plays, 96 yards, 3:21.**
- BAL – Matthew Hibner 2-yard pass from Lamar Jackson (Tyler Loop kick), 1:30. Ravens 31–28. **Drive: 11 plays, 64 yards, 4:15.**
- BAL – Tyler Loop 56-yard field goal, 0:01. Ravens 34–31. **Drive: 2 plays, 27 yards, 0:07.**

**Top passers**

- BAL – Lamar Jackson – 15/20, 186 yards, 2 TD
- DAL – Dak Prescott – 25/40, 276 yards, TD

**Top rushers**

- BAL – Derrick Henry – 26 rushes, 89 yards, 2 TD
- DAL – Javonte Williams – 19 rushes, 98 yards, TD

**Top receivers**

- BAL – Zay Flowers – 5 receptions, 84 yards
- DAL – CeeDee Lamb – 7 receptions, 112 yards

With seven seconds remaining, Lamar Jackson found Zay Flowers for a 27-yard gain and called a timeout with one second left, leaving kicker Tyler Loop to make the game-winning field goal as time expired.

During the game, Derrick Henry moved to ninth all-time in career rushing yards, moving ahead of Hall of Famer Eric Dickerson. He also moved to second in all-time Ravens rushing touchdowns, passing Ray Rice.

==== Week 4: Baltimore Ravens 24, Tennessee Titans 18 ====
Week 4: Tennessee Titans at Baltimore Ravens – Game summary

Quarter	1	2	3	4	Total
Titans	7	0	3	8	**18**
**Ravens**	7	17	0	0	**24**

at M&T Bank Stadium, Baltimore, Maryland

- Date: October 4
- Game time: 1:00 p.m. EDT
- Game weather: Overcast, 62 °F (17 °C)
- Game attendance: 70,101
- Referee: Shawn Hochuli
- TV announcers (CBS): Chris Lewis, Luke Kuechly and Amanda Balionis
- Recap, Game Book

Game information

**First quarter**

- BAL – Derrick Henry 5-yard run (Tyler Loop kick), 12:09. Ravens 7–0. **Drive: 5 plays, 37 yards, 1:59.**
- TEN – Tony Pollard 5-yard run (Joey Slye kick), 5:56. Tied 7–7. **Drive: 10 plays, 70 yards, 6:13.**

**Second quarter**

- BAL – Zay Flowers 19-yard pass from Lamar Jackson (Tyler Loop kick), 12:16. Ravens 14–7. **Drive: 6 plays, 81 yards, 2:51.**
- BAL – Mark Andrews 3-yard pass from Lamar Jackson (Tyler Loop kick), 3:32. Ravens 21–7. **Drive: 8 plays, 98 yards, 4:44.**
- BAL – Tyler Loop 64-yard field goal, 0:00. Ravens 24–7. **Drive: 6 plays, 19 yards, 0:35.**

**Third quarter**

- TEN – Joey Slye 33-yard field goal, 6:52. Ravens 24–10. **Drive: 10 plays, 76 yards, 5:50.**

**Fourth quarter**

- TEN – Wandale Robinson 3-yard pass from Cam Ward (Cam Ward-Gunnar Helm pass), 1:12. Ravens 24–18. **Drive: 7 plays, 70 yards, 2:08.**

**Top passers**

- TEN – Cam Ward – 20/31, 222 yards, TD, INT
- BAL – Lamar Jackson – 15/20, 222 yards, 2 TD

**Top rushers**

- TEN – Tony Pollard – 16 rushes, 48 yards, TD
- BAL – Derrick Henry – 23 rushes, 73 yards, TD

**Top receivers**

- TEN – Carnell Tate – 9 receptions, 145 yards
- BAL – Zay Flowers – 8 receptions, 118 yards, TD

==== Week 5: Baltimore Ravens 30, Atlanta Falcons 23 ====
Week 5: Baltimore Ravens at Atlanta Falcons – Game summary

Quarter	1	2	3	4	OT	Total
**Ravens**	3	6	6	8	7	**30**
Falcons	7	7	3	6	0	**23**

at Mercedes-Benz Stadium, Atlanta, Georgia

- Date: October 11
- Game time: 8:20 p.m. EDT
- Game weather: Partially cloudy, 64 °F (18 °C) (retractable roof open)
- Game attendance: 72,392
- Referee: Brad Allen
- TV announcers (NBC/Peacock): Mike Tirico, Cris Collinsworth and Melissa Stark
- Recap, Game Book

Game information

**First quarter**

- BAL – Tyler Loop 21-yard field goal, 10:27. Ravens 3–0. **Drive: 10 plays, 62 yards, 4:33.**
- ATL – Jessie Bates 36-yard fumble return (Nick Folk kick), 8:03. Falcons 7–3. **Drive: 3 plays, 11, yards, 1:30.**

**Second quarter**

- BAL – Tyler Loop 51-yard field goal, 8:04. Falcons 7–6. **Drive: 5 plays, 20 yards, 2:31.**
- ATL – Kyle Pitts 5-yard pass from Michael Penix (Nick Folk kick), 2:24. Falcons 14–6. **Drive: 9 plays, 78 yards, 5:40.**
- BAL – Tyler Loop 51-yard field goal, 0:00. Falcons 14–9. **Drive: 11 plays, 47 yards, 2:24.**

**Third quarter**

- ATL – Nick Folk 23-yard field goal, 9:51. Falcons 17–9. **Drive: 10 plays, 60 yards, 5:09.**
- BAL – Derrick Henry 18-yard pass from Tyler Huntley (pass failed), 6:53. Falcons 17–15. **Drive: 5 plays, 74 yards, 2:58.**

**Fourth quarter**

- ATL – Nick Folk 34-yard field goal, 8:03. Falcons 20–15. **Drive: 16 plays, 74 yards, 8:26.**
- ATL – Nick Folk 48-yard field goal, 2:31. Falcons 23–15. **Drive: 10 plays, 52 yards, 3:52.**
- BAL – Devontez Walker 7-yard pass from Tyler Huntley (Derrick Henry run), 0:40. Tied 23–23. **Drive: 6 plays, 71 yards, 1:51.**

**Overtime**

- BAL – Tyler Huntley 1-yard run (Tyler Loop kick), 2:57. Ravens 30–23. **Drive: 14 play, 68 yards, 7:03.**

**Top passers**

- BAL – Tyler Huntley – 24/32, 201 yards, 2 TD
- ATL – Michael Penix – 19/32, 240 yards, TD

**Top rushers**

- BAL – Derrick Henry – 24 rushes, 102 yards
- ATL – Bijan Robinson – 17 rushes, 86 yards

**Top receivers**

- BAL – Rashod Bateman – 5 receptions, 62 yards
- ATL – Drake London – 7 reception, 118 yards

Quarterback Lamar Jackson was ruled out of the game earlier in the week due to a left ankle sprain. With the win, the Ravens moved to first place in the AFC North.

==== Week 6: Cleveland Browns 13, Baltimore Ravens 10 ====
Week 6: Baltimore Ravens at Cleveland Browns – Game summary

Quarter	1	2	3	4	Total
Ravens	10	0	0	0	**10**
**Browns**	0	0	3	10	**13**

at Huntington Bank Field, Cleveland, Ohio

- Date: October 18
- Game time: 1:00 p.m. EDT
- Game weather: Sunny, 59 °F (15 °C)
- Game attendance: 65,872
- Referee: Carl Cheffers
- TV announcers (Fox): Kevin Kugler, Daryl Johnston and Allison Williams
- Recap, Game Book

Game information

**First quarter**

- BAL – Josh Cuevas 2-yard pass from Tyler Huntley (Tyler Loop kick), 8:11. Ravens 7–0. **Drive:11 plays, 66 yards, 6:49.**
- BAL – Tyler Loop 34-yard field goal, 4:37. Ravens 10–0. **Drive: 5 plays, 45 yards, 1:56.**

**Second quarter**

- No scoring plays

**Third quarter**

- CLE – Andre Szmyt 48-yard field goal, 7:48. Ravens 10–3. **Drive: 10 plays, 42 yards, 7:12.**

**Fourth quarter**

- CLE – Audric Estime 2-yard run (Andre Szmyt kick), 8:33. Tied 10–10. **Drive: 7 plays, 35 yards, 4:03.**
- CLE – Andre Szmyt 37-yard field goal, 0:00. Browns 13–10. **Drive: 10 plays, 62 yards, 1:59.**

**Top passers**

- BAL – Tyler Huntley – 19/31, 165 yards, TD
- CLE – Deshaun Watson – 16/26, 164 yards

**Top rushers**

- BAL – Derrick Henry – 17 rushes, 58 yards
- CLE – Jaleel McLaughlin – 9 rushes, 41 yards

**Top receivers**

- BAL – Zay Flowers – 6 receptions, 66 yards
- CLE – Jerry Jeudy – 4 receptions, 69 yards

Quarterback Lamar Jackson was once again ruled out of the game earlier in the week due to a left ankle sprain. Calais Campbell became just the third player in NFL history to record a sack at the age of 40 or over joining Bruce Smith and Clay Matthews Jr. The Ravens blew a 10–0 lead over the Browns, 13–10, marking the fifth consecutive season in which they failed to sweep Cleveland.

==== Week 7: Cincinnati Bengals 35, Baltimore Ravens 13 ====
Week 7: Cincinnati Bengals at Baltimore Ravens – Game summary

Quarter	1	2	3	4	Total
**Bengals**	0	0	14	21	**35**
Ravens	7	6	0	0	**13**

at M&T Bank Stadium, Baltimore, Maryland

- Date: October 25
- Game time: 1:00 p.m. EDT
- Game weather: Clear, 63 °F (17 °C)
- Game attendance: 70,464
- Referee: Shawn Smith
- TV announcers (CBS): Jim Nantz, J. J. Watt, and Tracy Wolfson
- Recap, Game Book

Game information

**First quarter**

- BAL – Zay Flowers 48-yard pass from Tyler Huntley (Tyler Loop kick), 13:36. Ravens 7–0. **Drive: 4 plays, 65 yards, 1:24.**

**Second quarter**

- BAL – Tyler Loop 34-yard field goal, 9:42. Ravens 10–0. **Drive: 18 plays, 78 yards, 11:00.**
- BAL – Tyler Loop 24-yard field goal, 0:50. Ravens 13–0. **Drive: 13 plays, 62 yards, 6:09.**

**Third quarter**

- CIN – Mike Gesicki 6-yard pass from Joe Burrow (Evan McPherson kick), 9:24. Ravens 13–7. **Drive: 9 plays, 66 yards, 5:36.**
- CIN – Tee Higgins 13-yard pass from Joe Burrow (Evan McPherson kick), 4:29. Bengals 14–13. **Drive: 6 plays, 47 yards, 2:41.**

**Fourth quarter**

- CIN – Samaje Perine 1-yard run (Evan McPherson kick), 11:14. Bengals 21–13. **Drive: 6 plays, 88 yards, 3:41.**
- CIN – Ja'Marr Chase 2-yard pass from Joe Burrow (Evan McPherson kick), 7:25. Bengals 28–13. **Drive: 5 plays, 79 yards, 1:54.**
- CIN – Drew Sample 16-yard pass from Joe Burrow (Evan McPherson kick), 6:21. Bengals 35–13. **Drive: 3 plays, 24 yards, 0:55.**

**Top passers**

- CIN – Joe Burrow – 22/30, 284 yards, 4 TD
- BAL – Tyler Huntley – 23/34, 298 yards, TD, INT

**Top rushers**

- CIN – Chase Brown – 11 rushes, 39 yards
- BAL – Derrick Henry – 17 rushes, 45 yards

**Top receivers**

- CIN – Tee Higgins – 6 receptions, 148 yards, TD
- BAL – Zay Flowers – 8 receptions, 137 yards, TD

Quarterback Lamar Jackson was once again ruled out of the game earlier in the week. This was Baltimore's second straight home loss to Cincinnati. The Ravens blew a 13–0 lead in the second half and were blown out, 35–13. They also became the third team in NFL history to lead by 13 points at halftime and still lose by at least 20 points.

==== Week 8: Buffalo Bills 36, Baltimore Ravens 10 ====
Week 8: Baltimore Ravens at Buffalo Bills – Game summary

Quarter	1	2	3	4	Total
Ravens	7	0	3	0	**10**
**Bills**	10	6	7	13	**36**

at Highmark Stadium, Orchard Park, New York

- Date: November 1
- Game time: 1:00 p.m. EST
- Game weather: Sunny, 70 °F (21 °C)
- Game attendance: 60,542
- Referee: Clay Martin
- TV announcers (CBS): Ian Eagle, Ross Tucker and Evan Washburn
- Recap, Game Book

Game information

**First quarter**

- BUF – Josh Allen 1-yard run (Tyler Bass kick), 10:10. Bills 7–0. **Drive: 10 plays, 60 yards, 4:50.**
- BUF – Tyler Bass 56-yard field goal, 6:05. Bills 10–0. **Drive: 5 plays, 19 yards, 2:26.**
- BAL – Derrick Henry 2-yard run (Tyler Loop kick), 4:05. Bills 10–7. **Drive: 2 plays, 17 yards, 0:52.**

**Second quarter**

- BUF – Tyler Bass 22-yard field goal, 9:50. Bills 13–7. **Drive: 9 plays, 16 yards, 4:11.**
- BUF – Tyler Bass 51-yard field goal, 0:09. Bills 16–7. **Drive: 4 plays, 0 yards, 0:59.**

**Third quarter**

- BAL – Tyler Loop 26-yard field goal, 11:28. Bills 16–10. **Drive: 8 plays, 61 yards, 3:32.**
- BUF – James Cook 5-yard run (Tyler Bass kick), 8:59. Bills 23–10. **Drive: 6 plays, 77 yards, 2:29.**

**Fourth quarter**

- BUF – D. J. Moore 11-yard pass from Josh Allen (pass failed), 12:18. Bills 29–10. **Drive: 8 plays, 65 yards, 3:39.**
- BUF – Dalton Kincaid 23-yard pass from Josh Allen (Tyler Bass kick), 5:58. Bills 36–10. **Drive: 6 plays, 43 yards, 3:33.**

**Top passers**

- BAL – Joe Fagnano – 10/21, 91 yards, INT
- BUF – Josh Allen – 21/34, 289 yards, 2 TD, INT

**Top rushers**

- BAL – Derrick Henry – 11 rushes, 53 yards, TD
- BUF – James Cook – 21 rushes, 80 yards, TD

**Top receivers**

- BAL – Rashod Bateman – 1 reception, 22 yards
- BUF – Dalton Kincaid – 4 receptions, 86 yards, TD

After returning from his sprained ankle, Lamar Jackson injured his thumb on the first offensive play for the Ravens and was quickly ruled out. Backup Tyler Huntley injured his toe in the second half leaving undrafted quarterback Joe Fagnano to play the rest of the game.

==== Week 9: Jacksonville Jaguars 33, Baltimore Ravens 10 ====
Week 9: Jacksonville Jaguars at Baltimore Ravens – Game summary

Quarter	1	2	3	4	Total
**Jaguars**	10	7	3	13	**33**
Ravens	3	0	0	7	**10**

at M&T Bank Stadium, Baltimore, Maryland

- Date: November 5
- Game time: 8:15 p.m. EST
- Game weather: Rain, 70 °F (21 °C)
- Game attendance: 70,007
- Referee: Brad Allen
- TV announcers (WMAR/Prime Video): Al Michaels, Kirk Herbstreit and Kaylee Hartung
- Recap, Game Book

Game information

**First quarter**

- JAX – Bhayshul Tuten 1-yard run (Cam Little kick), 11:20. Jaguars 7–0. **Drive: 7 plays, 77 yards, 3:40.**
- BAL – Jake Moody 53-yard field goal, 6:31. Jaguars 7–3. **Drive: 8 plays, 30 yards, 4:49.**
- JAX – Cam Little 36-yard field goal, 2:00. Jaguars 10–3. **Drive: 10 plays, 47 yards, 4:31.**

**Second quarter**

- JAX – Parker Washington 50-yard pass from Trevor Lawrence (Cam Little kick), 0:58. Jaguars 17–3. **Drive: 4 plays, 80 yards, 1:06.**

**Third quarter**

- JAX – Cam Little 45-yard field goal, 12:48. Jaguars 20–3. **Drive: 4 plays, -1 yards, 0:55.**

**Fourth quarter**

- JAX – Cam Little 47-yard field goal, 13:35. Jaguars 23–3. **Drive: 8 plays, 30 yards, 4:27.**
- JAX – Cam Little 33-yard field goal, 11:52. Jaguars 26–3. **Drive: 4 plays, 8 yards, 1:30.**
- JAX – Chris Rodriguez Jr. 2-yard run (Cam Little kick), 7:26. Jaguars 33–3. **Drive: 8 plays, 32 yards, 4:20.**
- BAL – Justice Hill 65-yard run (Jake Moody kick), 7:15. Jaguars 33–10. **Drive: 1 play, 65 yards, 0:11.**

**Top passers**

- JAX – Trevor Lawrence – 16/26, 242 yards, TD
- BAL – Joe Fagnano – 10/18, 60 yards, 2 INT

**Top rushers**

- JAX – Ameer Abdullah – 7 rushes, 30 yards
- BAL – Justice Hill – 9 rushes, 85 yards, TD

**Top receivers**

- JAX – Jakobi Meyers – 4 receptions, 65 yards
- BAL – Mark Andrews – 2 receptions, 19 yards

With quarterbacks Lamar Jackson and Tyler Huntley still on injured reserve, Joe Fagnano was selected as the new starter. The Ravens were dominated by Jacksonville's defense, restricting them to a field goal and touchdown. Their defense also failed to stop Trevor Lawrence, recording no sacks or interceptions against him at all, leading to a 33–10 collapse. Baltimore's dismal performance also marked the first time in the franchise's 31-year history that the Ravens have lost three consecutive games by 20 points or more.

==== Week 10: Los Angeles Chargers 23, Baltimore Ravens 20 ====
Week 10: Los Angeles Chargers at Baltimore Ravens – Game summary

Quarter	1	2	3	4	Total
**Chargers**	10	7	3	3	**23**
Ravens	0	10	3	7	**20**

at M&T Bank Stadium, Baltimore, Maryland

- Date: November 16
- Game time: 8:15 p.m. EST
- Game weather: Clear, 49 °F (9 °C)
- Game attendance: 69,679
- Referee: Adrian Hill
- TV announcers (ESPN): Joe Buck, Troy Aikman, Lisa Salters, and Laura Rutledge
- Recap, Game Book

Game information

**First quarter**

- LAC – Justin Herbert 22-yard run (Cameron Dicker kick), 10:39. Chargers 7–0. **Drive: 6 plays, 63 yards, 2:49.**
- LAC – Cameron Dicker 38-yard field goal, 2:03. Chargers 10–0. **Drive: 6 plays, 40 yards, 2:36.**

**Second quarter**

- BAL – Derrick Henry 2-yard run (Riley Patterson kick), 12:33. Chargers 10–7. **Drive: 10 plays, 65 yards, 4:30.**
- LAC – Omarion Hampton 1-yard run (Cameron Dicker kick), 1:56. Chargers 17–7. **Drive: 13 plays, 48 yards, 7:35.**
- BAL – Riley Patterson 26-yard field goal, 0:00. Chargers 17–10. **Drive: 10 plays, 72 yards, 1:56.**

**Third quarter**

- LAC – Cameron Dicker 34-yard field goal, 9:03. Chargers 20–10. **Drive: 5 plays, 21 yards, 1:46.**
- BAL – Riley Patterson 36-yard field goal, 3:36. Chargers 20–13. **Drive: 12 plays, 54 yards, 5:27.**

**Fourth quarter**

- LAC – Cameron Dicker 35-yard field goal, 14:56. Chargers 23–13. **Drive: 6 plays, 53 yards, 3:40.**
- BAL – Derrick Henry 1-yard run (Riley Patterson kick), 10:23. Chargers 23–20. **Drive: 10 plays, 71 yards, 4:33.**

**Top passers**

- LAC – Justin Herbert – 12/18, 129 yards
- BAL – Jacoby Brissett – 33/48, 340 yards, INT

**Top rushers**

- LAC – Omarion Hampton – 22 rushes, 105 yards, TD
- BAL – Derrick Henry – 10 rushes, 10 yards, 2 TD

**Top receivers**

- LAC – Tre Harris – 5 receptions, 86 yards
- BAL – Mark Andrews – 8 receptions, 82 yards

This was quarterback Jacoby Brissett's debut with Baltimore after a trade with the Arizona Cardinals. Despite the loss, the Ravens ended their three-game streak of losing games by at least 20 points.

==== Week 11: Carolina Panthers 35, Baltimore Ravens 33 ====
Week 11: Baltimore Ravens at Carolina Panthers – Game summary

Quarter	1	2	3	4	Total
Ravens	12	14	0	7	**33**
**Panthers**	7	15	10	3	**35**

at Bank of America Stadium, Charlotte, North Carolina

- Date: November 22
- Game time: 1:00 p.m. EST
- Game weather: Misting, 58 °F (14 °C)
- Game attendance: 72,778
- Referee: Shawn Hochuli
- TV announcers (Fox): Kenny Albert, Jonathan Vilma, and Megan Olivi
- Recap, Game Book

Game information

**First quarter**

- BAL – Bryce Young sacked in the end zone by Mike Green for a safety, 12:22. Ravens 2–0.
- BAL – Rashod Bateman 52-yard pass from Jacoby Brissett (Riley Patterson kick), 11:21. Ravens 9–0. **Drive: 3 plays, 70 yards, 1:01.**
- BAL – Riley Patterson 28-yard field goal, 2:48. Ravens 12–0. **Drive: 15 plays, 69 yards, 6:36.**
- CAR – Mitchell Evans 23-yard pass from Bryce Young (Ryan Fitzgerald kick), 00:1. Ravens 12–7. **Drive: 5 plays, 79 yards, 2:47.**

**Second quarter**

- CAR – Chuba Hubbard 18-yard run (Ryan Fitzgerald kick), 10:01. Panthers 14–12. **Drive: 2 plays, 23 yards, 0:34.**
- BAL – Devontez Walker 86-yard kickoff return (Riley Patterson kick), 9:49. Ravens 19–14.
- CAR – Tetairoa McMillan 7-yard pass from Bryce Young (Chuba Hubbard run), 5:06. Panthers 22–19. **Drive: 9 plays, 69 yards, 4:43.**
- BAL – Justice Hill 19-yard run (Riley Patterson kick), 2:22. Ravens 26–22. **Drive: 5 plays, 71 yards, 2:44.**

**Third quarter**

- CAR – Chuba Hubbard 1-yard run (Ryan Fitzgerald kick), 11:01. Panthers 29–26. **Drive: 8 plays, 56 yards, 3:59.**
- CAR – Ryan Fitzpatrick 33-yard field goal, 0:31. Panthers 32–26. **Drive: 8 plays, 32 yards, 3:48.**

**Fourth quarter**

- BAL – Derrick Henry 15-yard run (Riley Patterson kick), 6:32. Ravens 33–32. **Drive: 10 plays, 80 yards, 5:44.**
- CAR – Ryan Fitzpatrick 37-yard field goal, 1:44. Panthers 35–33. **Drive: 12 plays, 55 yards, 4:48.**

**Top passers**

- BAL – Jacoby Brissett – 24/37, 276 yards, TD, INT
- CAR – Bryce Young – 22/30, 254 yards, 2 TD, INT

**Top rushers**

- BAL – Derrick Henry – 13 rushes, 94 yards, TD
- CAR – Chuba Hubbard – 27 rushes, 120 yards, 2 TD

**Top receivers**

- BAL – Zay Flowers – 8 receptions, 97 yards
- CAR – Tetairoa McMillan – 6 reception, 71 yards, TD

==== Week 12: at Houston Texans ====
Week 12: Baltimore Ravens at Houston Texans – Game summary

Quarter	1	2	3	4	Total
Ravens	0	0	0	0	**0**
Texans	0	0	0	0	**0**

at Reliant Stadium, Houston, Texas

- Date: November 29
- Game time: 1:00 p.m. EST/12:00 p.m. CST
- Game weather: TBD (retractable roof stadium)
- TV: CBS
- Preview

=== Standings ===
==== Division ====
AFC North
	W	L	T	PCT	DIV	CONF	PF	PA	STK
Cincinnati Bengals	7	2	0	.778	2–1	5–2	278	193	W5
Cleveland Browns	6	4	0	.600	2–1	4–3	188	220	W1
Pittsburgh Steelers	6	4	0	.600	2–2	3–3	214	201	L2
Baltimore Ravens	4	7	0	.364	0–2	2–5	242	294	L6

==== Conference ====
AFC
Seed	Team	Division	W	L	T	PCT	DIV	CONF	SOS	SOV	STK
**Division leaders**
1	Buffalo Bills	East	9	1	0	.900	2–1	6–1	.424	.416	W6
2	Kansas City Chiefs	West	8	2	0	.800	3–1	6–1	.374	.300	W3
3 (Note: Jacksonville wins tie break over Cincinnati based on head-to-head victory.)	Jacksonville Jaguars	South	7	2	0	.778	2–1	6–2	.444	.408	W3
4	Cincinnati Bengals	North	7	2	0	.778	2–1	5–2	.389	.310	W5
**Wild cards**
5	Denver Broncos	West	7	2	0	.778	2–1	3–1	.591	.522	W5
6 (Note: Cleveland wins tie break over Pittsburgh based on division record.)	Cleveland Browns	North	6	4	0	.600	2–1	4–3	.410	.377	W1
7	Pittsburgh Steelers	North	6	4	0	.600	2–2	3–3	.465	.417	L2
**In the hunt**
8	New England Patriots	East	5	5	0	.500	3–0	5–1	.576	.440	L2
9 (Note: Houston wins tie break over Las Vegas based on strength of victory.)	Houston Texans	South	4	6	0	.400	3–1	4–4	.480	.308	W1
10	Las Vegas Raiders	West	4	6	0	.400	1–1	3–3	.500	.179	L2
11	Baltimore Ravens	North	4	7	0	.364	0–2	2–5	.459	.286	L6
12	Indianapolis Colts	South	3	8	0	.273	1–3	2–6	.463	.293	L1
13	New York Jets	East	2	8	0	.200	0–3	2–5	.560	.350	L5
14	Los Angeles Chargers	West	1	8	0	.111	0–3	1–5	.560	.364	W1
15 (Note: Tennessee wins tie break over Miami based on strength of victory.)	Tennessee Titans	South	1	9	0	.100	1–2	1–6	.465	.273	L4
16	Miami Dolphins	East	1	9	0	.100	1–2	1–6	.622	.200	L4

== Individual awards ==
=== Regular season ===
Recipient	Award(s)	Statline
Tyler Loop	Week 3: AFC Special Teams Player of the Week	XP 4/4; FG 2/2; Game winning 56 yard field goal
