= New England Association of Schools and Colleges =

American university accreditation organization

- Abbreviation: NEASC
- Formation: 1885
- Purpose: Educational accreditation
- Headquarters: Lowell, Massachusetts
- Region served: New England; United States; 85+ foreign countries
- Executive Director: Cameron Staples
- Website: neasc.org

The New England Association of Schools and Colleges, Inc. (NEASC /ˈniːæsk/ NEE-ask) is an American educational organization that accredits private and public secondary schools (high schools and technical/career institutions), primarily in New England. It also accredits international secondary schools (primarily in the Middle East and Europe) and, less frequently, high schools in other U.S. states.

Until 2018, NEASC was the primary accrediting organization for universities in New England. Since 2018, the former NEASC university accreditation body is now an independent organization, the New England Commission of Higher Education (NECHE). NEASC retained its old name after the split, although the word "colleges" is now an anachronism.

== History ==
The New England Association of Colleges and Secondary Schools was founded in 1885 by a group of university administrators led by Harvard president Charles W. Eliot and Wellesley president Alice Freeman. The current name was adopted in 1971. NEASC is headquartered in Lowell, Massachusetts.

=== College accreditation ===
The original impetus for educational accreditation was American universities' desire for recognition by the international academic community. Starting in 1912, several European universities, led by the University of Berlin, announced that they would only recognize American university degrees awarded by a member of the Association of American Universities (AAU), an industry group of leading research universities. The AAU recognized that European universities wanted some kind of formal credential, but left the issue to other organizations. The American Council of Education briefly accredited universities starting in 1921, but abandoned those efforts in 1935.

Over time, responsibility for university accreditation fell to a set of regional self-regulators. NEASC and its successor officially trace back their accreditation efforts to 1929. However, in the early days, accreditation merely meant membership in NEASC; although NEASC approved a set of standards for member institutions, it treated those standards as advisory.

When government regulators began basing eligibility for federal and state-provided financial aid on university accreditation (a practice that continues today), Congress and the Department of Education (DOE) began scrutinizing the accreditation agencies more closely. In the late 2010s, DOE began planning to strengthen existing rules protecting the independence of accreditation agencies (34 CFR § 602.14). In 2018, anticipating the regulatory change, NEASC spun off its university accreditation arm into an independent body, which is now known as the New England Commission of Higher Education.

=== Secondary school accreditation ===
When NEASC recognized universities in 1929, it also recognized several public and private secondary schools (mostly college-preparatory schools). As with the colleges, NEASC's original standards for prep schools were advisory, and accreditation was synonymous with NEASC membership. Although not every major New England prep school was a NEASC member in 1929, several joined shortly after NEASC membership became linked with accreditation (e.g., Exeter in 1932 and Hotchkiss in 1933). Today, a private school must be accredited in order to join the National Association of Independent Schools.

Formalized secondary school accreditation reviews were not popularized until the 1950s. According to one school's historian, the increasing popularity of college led to the foundation of many new prep schools, some of which were fraudulent. As a result, some reformers began pushing for closer government regulation of private schools. "To forestall governmental intervention, [NEASC] (and similar groups elsewhere) decided that it would hold periodic strict evaluations of its member institutions, and accredit them if they seemed to merit it."

== Accreditation efforts ==
=== Accredited institutions ===
As of June 14, 2024, NEASC accredited 659 United States public schools, 532 United States private schools (including religious schools), and 339 international schools (including several international schools in the United States). The 659 U.S. public schools may represent a decrease from the roughly 725 schools accredited by NEASC in October 2022.

Of the 659 U.S. public schools, all but one were located in the New England states (272 in Massachusetts, 169 in Connecticut, 80 in New Hampshire, 72 in Maine, 41 in Rhode Island, and 24 in Vermont). Of the 532 U.S. private schools, 521 were located in New England (206 in Massachusetts, 143 in Connecticut, 47 in Rhode Island, 44 in Maine, 43 in New Hampshire, and 38 in Vermont).

Internationally, NEASC's biggest markets are the United Arab Emirates (46 schools), Spain (43 schools), Germany (18 schools), Qatar (16 schools), and Switzerland (15 schools).

=== Organization ===
NEASC is made up of three commissions: the Commission on Independent Schools, the Commission on International Education, and the Commission on Public Schools. The commissions decide matters of accreditation in the context of research-driven standards reviewed by their membership.

=== Cost ===
Schools must pay a reviewer's fee to be accredited by NEASC, which may cost tens of thousands of dollars, in addition to yearly NEASC membership dues in the thousands of dollars. NEASC's website does not disclose its fees for domestic institutions, but it estimates that for international schools, as of 2023, "a hypothetical school of 500 students with no delays in the process" would be charged approximately $18,980 over the course of a five-year accreditation cycle.

When South Hadley High School resigned from NEASC in 2024, its principal stated that its yearly membership dues were approximately $4,000 and that in 2014, its decennial accreditation review cost $26,000. In addition, in February 2023, a representative of the Vermont Principals' Association said that two school principals had told him that their annual dues were $3,600 and $4,340, respectively.

== Controversies ==
=== Stakeholder pressure ===
School stakeholders who disagree with the leadership or direction of a particular school sometimes use NEASC accreditation as a pressure point to demand policy changes.

In 2023, NEASC cancelled the Interdistrict School for Arts and Communication's (New London, Connecticut) application for accreditation after a teacher sued the school for creating a toxic work environment and the school declined to cooperate with an investigation. In 2024, a group of concerned individuals requested a meeting with NEASC's reviewers during an accreditation visit to Maloney High School (Meriden, Connecticut), claiming that the school made changes during the NEASC visit in order to give the reviewers an artificially impressive view of the school, and that they wanted an opportunity to tell NEASC about the school as they saw it. NEASC declined to meet with the group, explaining that the group needed to express its concerns through existing channels.

=== Criticism ===
In 2015, the Lowell Sun published an article in which several school districts questioned the value of NEASC accreditation after NEASC formally warned Billerica Memorial High School that it was in danger of losing its accreditation. The article noted that Burlington High School had suspended its NEASC membership, claiming that the universities its students attended did not take NEASC accreditation into account when evaluating college applications. However, the Sun also explained that at least one public university system (the University of California) requires applicants to graduate from an accredited secondary institution. In a letter to the editor, NEASC added that following a parent outcry, Burlington High School had already applied for re-accreditation, which was granted following a formal review in 2017.

In February 2023, Vermont Principals' Association executive director Jay Nichols submitted a two-page statement to the Vermont legislature, which argued that the legislature should not require public schools to seek NEASC accreditation. He opined that most Vermont public schools do not seek accreditation because of the high cost and large amount of paperwork. He suggested that the situation may be different for private schools, as those schools do not have "traditional local and state oversight" and are exempted from certain federal disclosure requirements.

== See also ==
- Educational accreditation
- New England Commission of Higher Education
- Western Association of Schools and Colleges
- Middle States Association of Colleges and Schools
- Cognia (accreditor for the North Central, Northwest, and Southern regions, formerly known as AdvancED)
