= Cases and Materials on Corporations =

Casebook edited by Jesse H. Choper, John C. Coffee, Jr., and Ronald J. Gilson

- Sixth edition
- Author: Jesse H. Choper, John C. Coffee, Jr., and Ronald J. Gilson
- Publisher: Aspen Publishers (Wolters Kluwer)
- Publication date: 2008
- ISBN: 978-0-7355-1245-0
- OCLC: 43118197
- Dewey Decimal: 346.73/066 21
- LC Class: KF1413 .F7 2000

Cases and Materials on Corporations is a casebook about corporate law.

The eighth edition of the book was published in 2013 and authored by Jesse H. Choper, John C. Coffee, Jr., and Ronald J. Gilson. Published in 2021, the book's ninth edition was authored by John C. Coffee, Ronald J. Gilson, and Brian JM Quinn.

== Reception ==
The 1951 edition of Cases and Materials on Corporations and Partnerships was by Alexander Hamilton Frey. Robert M. Cooper of The Yale Law Journal praised the 1951 edition, writing, that it was a "thoroughly competent and outstandingly comprehensive" compilation and update to his 1935 casebook about "Business Associations". Cooper concluded, "The author's use of the corporate transaction as a classification for his materials is refreshing and challenging to the teacher. The student should also find his efforts toward simplicity and brevity a welcome approach in this area of growing corporate complexities." Writing for the Journal of Legal Education, Cornelius J. Moynihan lauded the 1951 edition as "a first-rate teaching vehicle for the primary subject of corporations but also offers additional flexibility in that sufficient materials are included for a basic understanding of the law of partnerships".

Cases and Materials on Corporations, a 1966 edition of the book, was by Alexander H. Frey, C. Robert Morris, Jr., and Jesse H. Choper. Stanley Siegl of the Michigan Law Review called the 1966 edition "the most teachable of the available corporations books", citing its "less exhaustive notes, primarily keyed to comprehension rather than comprehensiveness". In a mixed review of the 1966 edition, Marsh Harold Jr., who reviewed the book for the Journal of Legal Education, said it had "a great deal of very useful material and that it could have been an excellent teaching tool" but criticized the book's editing for not catching several errors.
