= List of Baltimore Ravens head coaches =

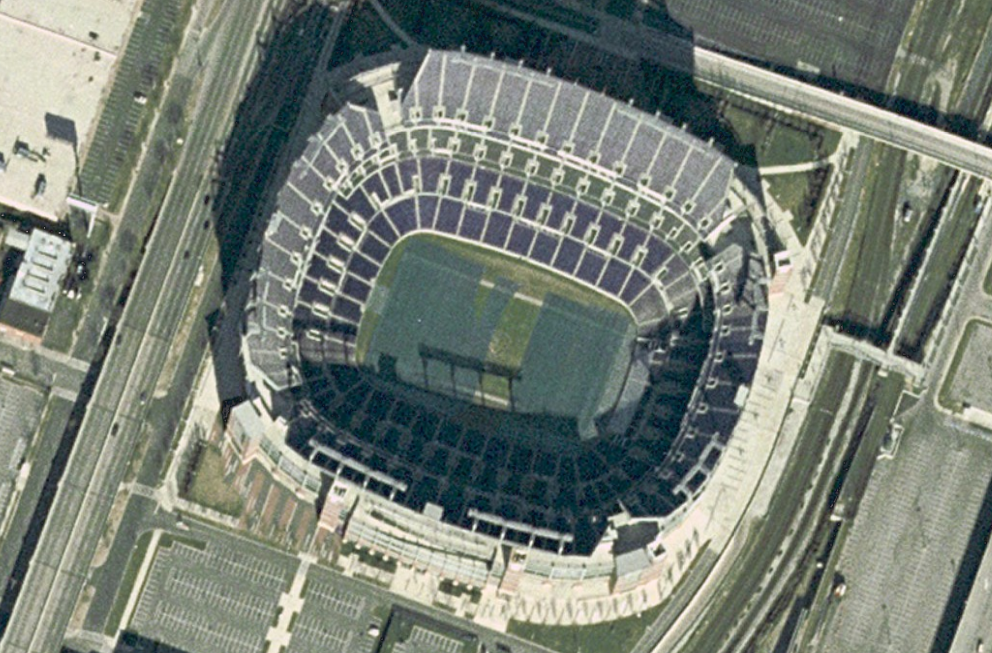
Satellite picture of the Ravens' home, M&T Bank Stadium

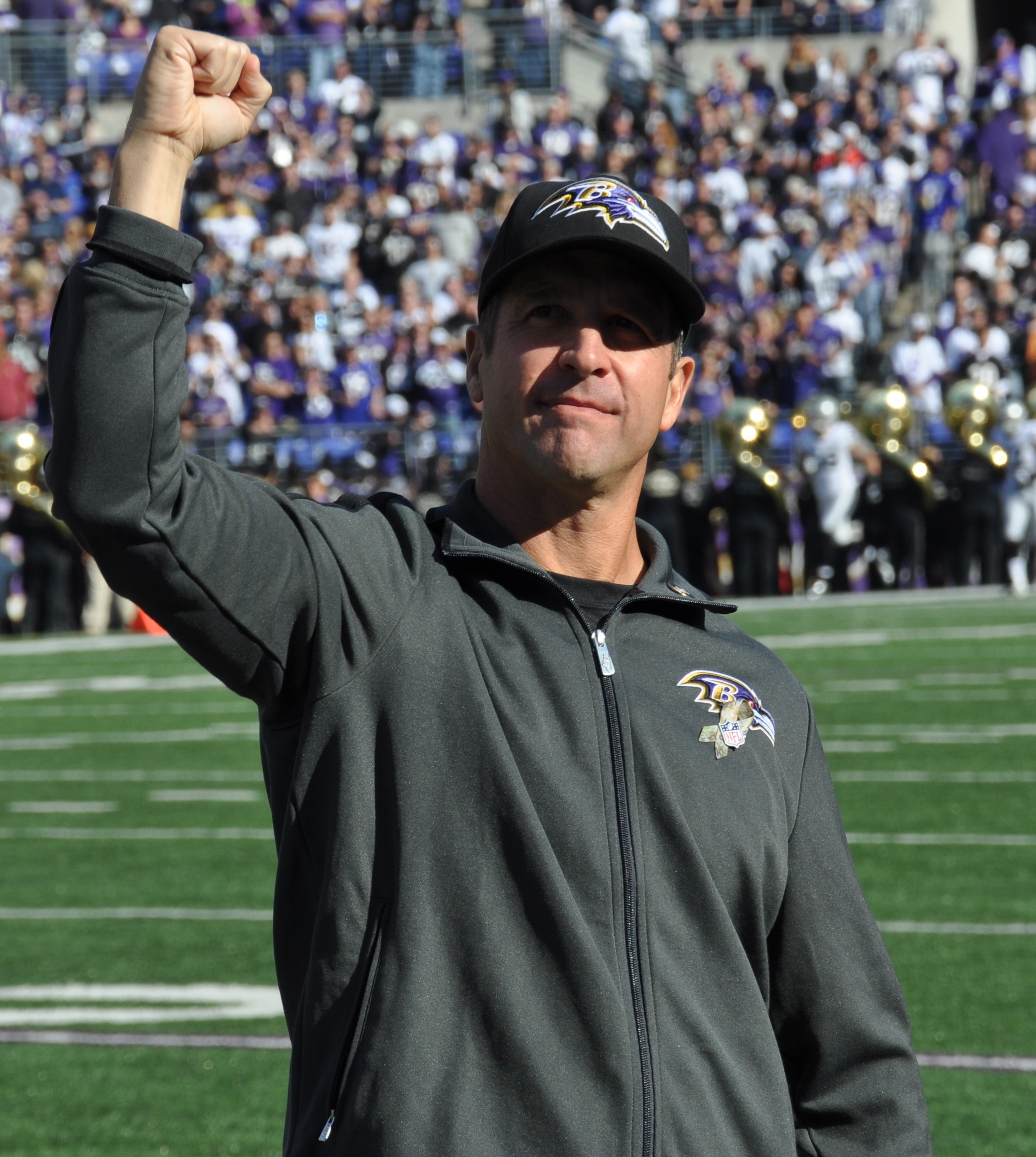
John Harbaugh is the longest-serving head coach of the Ravens, coaching the franchise from 2008 to 2025. He is the most successful head coach in franchise history.

The Baltimore Ravens are an American football team based in Baltimore, Maryland. They are currently members of the North division of the American Football Conference (AFC) in the National Football League (NFL). In 1996, the Ravens joined the American Football Conference (AFC) of the National Football League (NFL) after former Cleveland Browns owner Art Modell decided to relocate the team to Baltimore. However, as part of an agreement between Modell, the NFL and the city of Cleveland, Modell left the Browns' name, colors and history in Cleveland. However, the team's players and staff were permitted to move to Baltimore with the franchise. For this reason, the Ravens are considered an expansion team. The Browns name was later reintroduced in 1999.

Modell had planned to bring Bill Belichick to Baltimore as head coach, but Belichick was fired February 14, 1996. Instead, Modell hired Ted Marchibroda on February 15 as the first head coach of the Ravens franchise in 1996. Marchibroda had previously coached the Baltimore Colts in the 1970s and the Indianapolis Colts in the 1990s. After three seasons, his contract was not renewed. Brian Billick succeeded him after accepting a six-year coaching contract from Modell. Billick went on to lead the Ravens to four playoff appearances in his nine years as coach. In 2000, he led the Ravens to a 34–7 victory in Super Bowl XXXV against the New York Giants. On December 31, 2007, Billick was fired by Ravens owner Steve Bisciotti after leading the Ravens to a 5–11 record in the 2007 season. Less than three weeks later, the Ravens hired John Harbaugh as the franchise's third head coach. Harbaugh reached the playoffs in each of his first five seasons as Ravens head coach, bringing success to the franchise, including a victory in Super Bowl XLVII, in which the Ravens beat the San Francisco 49ers, led by John's brother Jim Harbaugh, by a score of 34–31.

== Coaches ==
#	Number of coaches (Note: A running total of the number of coaches of the Ravens. Thus, any coach who has two or more terms as head coach is only counted once.)
Yrs	Years coached
First	First season coached
Last	Last season coached
GC	Games Coached
W	Wins
L	Loses
T	Ties
W%	Win – Loss percentage
*	Spent entire NFL head coaching career with the Ravens

Note: Statistics are accurate through the conclusion of week 11 of the 2026 NFL season.

#	Image	Name	Term (Note: Each year is linked to an article about that particular NFL season.)			Regular season					Playoffs				Accomplishments	Ref.
#	Image	Name	Yrs	First	Last	GC	W	L	T	W%	GC	W	L	W%	Accomplishments	Ref.
1		Ted Marchibroda	3	1996	1998	48	16	31	1	.344	—					
2		Brian Billick*	9	1999	2007	144	80	64	0	.556	8	5	3	.625	Super Bowl Championship (XXXV); AFC Championship (2000); 2 AFC North Championships (2003, 2006); 4 Playoff Berths	
3		John Harbaugh	18	2008	2025	293	180	113	0	.614	24	13	11	.542	Super Bowl Championship (XLVII); AFC Championship (2012); 6 AFC North Championships (2011, 2012, 2018, 2019, 2023, 2024); 12 Playoff Berths; AP NFL Coach of the Year (2019)	
4		Jesse Minter*	1	2026	present	11	4	7	0	.364	—					
Totals			31	1996	2026	496	280	215	1	.566	32	18	14	.563		
