= Jane Purcell Coffee =

American mathematician (1944–2022)

Jane C. Purcell Coffee
- Born: 1944; Meriden, Connecticut, U.S.
- Died: September 23, 2022 (aged 77–78)
- Education: Smith College; University of Pennsylvania (PhD)
- Known for: Founding the Teacher Education Honors Academy at the College of Staten Island
- Spouse: John C. Coffee
- Children: 1
- Scientific career
- Fields: Mathematics
- Workplaces: College of Staten Island; United States Naval Academy
- Thesis: A Condition for a Filtered Ring to be Isomorphic to its Associated Graded Ring (1970)
- Doctoral advisor: Murray Gerstenhaber

Jane C. Purcell Coffee (1944 – September 23, 2022) was an American mathematician, one of the first women to earn a doctorate in mathematics at the University of Pennsylvania, and the founder of the Teacher Education Honors Academy at the College of Staten Island.

== Early life and education ==
Coffee was the daughter of James Purcell, a civil engineer and Democratic Party politician, who died when she was young. She was born in Meriden, Connecticut in 1944, and became the valedictorian of O.H. Platt High School in Meriden. She attended Smith College on a scholarship, where mathematics professor Neal McCoy became a faculty mentor. There, she met her future husband, legal scholar John C. Coffee Jr., a student at Amherst College. She graduated from Smith in 1966.

Next, she went to the University of Pennsylvania for graduate study in mathematics, while John Coffee studied law at Yale University. She persisted as "one of the first women in her PhD program" despite facing discriminatory practices such as segregating her with the mathematicians' wives at regular gatherings where the male mathematicians in the department would discuss their research. She completed her Ph.D. in 1970, with a thesis on abstract algebra, A Condition for a Filtered Ring to be Isomorphic to its Associated Graded Ring, supervised by Murray Gerstenhaber.

== Career ==
In order to avoid hiring discrimination, Coffee applied to faculty positions using only her first initial, "J.". This led to a job offer at Richmond College, which later became the College of Staten Island, and she began working there in 1970.

During this time, she lived with her husband in Maplewood, New Jersey, commuting to their jobs in Staten Island and in New York City, respectively. Their daughter, Megan Coffee (now a medical researcher at Columbia University) was born in 1976. In the late 1970s, Coffee took a new faculty position, at the United States Naval Academy in Annapolis, Maryland, at about the same time as her husband became a professor at Georgetown University in Washington, DC. As child care, she sat her daughter at the back of her classroom at the academy.

After this, Coffee returned to the College of Staten Island, as chair of mathematics, and her husband moved to Columbia University. An incident from this time spurred her creation of the college's Teacher Education Honors Academy: she met a woman on a train who freely confessed her innumeracy, only to discover later that the same woman was a teacher at her daughter's elementary school. The academy aimed at improving that situation by preparing college students for a career as a secondary school STEM educator.

== Personal life and death ==
She married John C. Coffee with whom she had 1 daughter.

She died on September 23, 2022.
