= Israel Woolfork =

American football coach (born 1990)

Baltimore Ravens
- Title: Quarterbacks coach

Personal information
- Born: 1990 (age 35–36); Livonia, Michigan, U.S.

Career information
- Position: Wide receiver
- High school: Franklin (Livonia, Michigan)
- College: Grand Valley State

Career history
- Miami (OH) (2013–2014) Graduate assistant; Miami (OH) (2015–2017) Running backs coach; Miami (OH) (2018–2021) Wide receivers coach; Cleveland Browns (2021) Bill Walsh NFL diversity coaching fellowship; Cleveland Browns (2022) Bill Walsh coaching fellowship; Arizona Cardinals (2023–2025) Quarterbacks coach; Baltimore Ravens (2026–present) Quarterbacks coach

Israel Woolfork (born 1990) is an American professional football coach who is the quarterbacks coach for the Baltimore Ravens of the National Football League (NFL). He previously served as the quarterbacks coach for the Arizona Cardinals from 2023 to 2025.

Woolfork played college football at Grand Valley State and has previously served as an assistant coach for Miami University, Cleveland Browns and the Arizona Cardinals.

== Early life ==
A native of Livonia, Michigan, Woolfork attended Benjamin Franklin High School. He then went on to play as a wide receiver at Grand Valley State University from 2008 to 2012 and graduated with a degree in sports leadership.

== Coaching career ==
=== Cleveland Browns ===
In 2021, Woolfork joined the Cleveland Browns under the Bill Walsh NFL diversity coaching fellowship. In 2022, Woolfork rejoined the Browns under the Bill Walsh coaching fellowship.

=== Arizona Cardinals ===
On February 21, 2023, Woolfork was hired by the Arizona Cardinals as their quarterbacks coach under head coach Jonathan Gannon.

=== Baltimore Ravens ===
On February 4, 2026, Woolfork was hired by the Baltimore Ravens as their quarterbacks coach under head coach Jesse Minter and offensive coordinator Declan Doyle.
