= Durham Smythe =

American football player (born 1995)

No. 80 – Baltimore Ravens
- Position: Tight end
- Roster status: Injured reserve

Personal information
- Born: August 9, 1995 (age 31); Havertown, Pennsylvania, U.S.
- Listed height: 6 ft 5 in (1.96 m)
- Listed weight: 248 lb (112 kg)

Career information
- High school: Belton (Belton, Texas)
- College: Notre Dame (2013–2017)
- NFL draft: 2018: 4th round, 123rd overall pick

Career history
- Miami Dolphins (2018–2024); Chicago Bears (2025); Baltimore Ravens (2026–present)

Career NFL statistics as of 2026
- Receptions: 137
- Receiving yards: 1,257
- Receiving touchdowns: 3
- Stats at Pro Football Reference

Durham Smythe (born August 9, 1995) is an American professional football tight end for the Baltimore Ravens of the National Football League (NFL). He played college football for the Notre Dame Fighting Irish.

== Early life ==
Smythe attended and played high school football at Belton High School.

== College career ==
Smythe attended and played college football at Notre Dame. He totaled 28 receptions for 381 receiving yards and six receiving touchdowns in four years.

=== Statistics ===
Season	Team	Games		Receiving			
Season	Team	GP	GS	Rec	Yds	Avg	TD
2013	Notre Dame	0	0	Redshirt			
2014	Notre Dame	13	0	1	7	7.0	0
2015	Notre Dame	3	3	3	18	6.0	1
2016	Notre Dame	12	12	9	112	12.4	4
2017	Notre Dame	13	13	15	244	16.3	1
Career		41	28	28	381	13.6	6

== Professional career ==
Pre-draft measurables
Height	Weight	Arm length	Hand span	Wingspan	40-yard dash	10-yard split	20-yard split	20-yard shuttle	Three-cone drill	Vertical jump	Broad jump	Bench press
6 ft 5 3/8 in (1.97 m)	253 lb (115 kg)	31 3/4 in (0.81 m)	9 1/4 in (0.23 m)	6 ft 5 3/8 in (1.97 m)	4.81 s	1.66 s	2.79 s	4.23 s	7.17 s	31.0 in (0.79 m)	9 ft 2 in (2.79 m)	18 reps
All values from NFL Combine

=== Miami Dolphins ===
Smythe was selected by the Miami Dolphins in the fourth round with the 123rd overall pick in the 2018 NFL draft, using the pick acquired from the Cleveland Browns in the Jarvis Landry trade. He made his NFL debut in Week 1 of the 2018 season against the Tennessee Titans. He recorded his first two career receptions in Week 12 against the Indianapolis Colts. In the 2018 season, he totaled six receptions for 50 receiving yards.

In the 2019 season, Smythe appeared in all 16 games, of which he started 14. He finished with seven receptions for 65 receiving yards.

In Week 6 of the 2020 season, he scored his first professional touchdown on a four-yard reception against the New York Jets. In the 2020 season, Smythe had 26 receptions for 208 yards and two touchdowns in 15 games and 13 starts.

In the 2021 season, Smythe appeared in all 17 games and started 12. He finished with 34 receptions for 357 yards.

On March 22, 2022, Smythe re-signed with the Dolphins on a two-year contract. In the 2022 season, he appeared in 16 games and started 15. He finished with 15 receptions for 129 yards and one touchdown, which came in Week 12 against Houston.

On April 3, 2023, Smythe signed a contract extension with the Dolphins that runs through the 2025 season. He finished the 2023 season with 35 receptions for 366 yards. In the 2024 season, he had nine receptions for 53 yards and had a role on special teams.

Smythe was released by the Dolphins on February 14, 2025, after spending seven seasons with the team.

=== Chicago Bears ===
On March 12, 2025, Smythe signed with the Chicago Bears. During the 2025 season, he primarily served as a blocking tight end or fullback.

=== Baltimore Ravens ===
On March 12, 2026, Smythe signed a one-year contract worth $3 million, including a $1.5 million signing bonus and $3 million guaranteed with the Baltimore Ravens. He followed Bears offensive coordinator Declan Doyle to Baltimore, where he was hired as the play caller after the 2025 season, as his familiarity with Doyle meant he could mentor other players into learning Doyle's system. During the 2026 season, Smythe recorded two targets with one catch for four yards in his first four games, was playing over 50 percent of the team's offensive snaps, and played a big role as a blocker. During the Ravens' Week 4 game against the Tennessee Titans, Smythe tore his Achilles tendon, ending his season.

== NFL career statistics ==
Legend
**Bold**	Career high

=== Regular season ===
Year	Team	Games		Receiving					Rushing					Fumbles	
Year	Team	GP	GS	Rec	Yds	Avg	Lng	TD	Att	Yds	Avg	Lng	TD	Fum	Lost
2018	MIA	15	2	6	50	8.3	21	0	0	0	0.0	0	0	0	0
2019	MIA	16	14	7	65	9.3	24	0	0	0	0.0	0	0	0	0
2020	MIA	15	13	26	208	8.0	19	**2**	0	0	0.0	0	0	0	0
2021	MIA	17	12	34	357	**10.5**	25	0	**2**	**3**	**1.5**	**2**	0	0	0
2022	MIA	16	15	15	129	8.6	**26**	1	**2**	1	0.5	1	**1**	0	0
2023	MIA	16	14	**35**	**366**	**10.5**	22	0	0	0	0.0	0	0	0	0
2024	MIA	17	4	9	53	5.9	8	0	0	0	0.0	0	0	0	0
2025	CHI	17	2	4	25	6.3	11	0	0	0	0.0	0	0	0	0
2026	BAL	1	1	1	4	4.0	4	0	0	0	0.0	0	0	0	0
Career		130	77	137	1,257	13.2	30	3	4	4	1.0	2	1	0	0

=== Postseason ===
Year	Team	Games		Receiving					Rushing					Fumbles	
Year	Team	GP	GS	Rec	Yds	Avg	Lng	TD	Att	Yds	Avg	Lng	TD	Fum	Lost
2022	MIA	1	1	1	**20**	**20.0**	**20**	0	0	0	0.0	0	0	0	0
2023	MIA	1	1	**3**	12	4.0	5	0	0	0	0.0	0	0	0	0
2025	CHI	2	0	2	11	5.5	6	0	0	0	0.0	0	0	0	0
Career		4	2	6	43	7.2	20	0	0	0	0.0	0	0	0	0
