= John Jenkins (defensive tackle) =

American football player (born 1989)

No. 94 – Baltimore Ravens
- Position: Nose tackle
- Roster status: Active

Personal information
- Born: July 11, 1989 (age 37); Stamford, Connecticut, U.S.
- Listed height: 6 ft 3 in (1.91 m)
- Listed weight: 360 lb (163 kg)

Career information
- High school: Francis T. Maloney (Meriden, Connecticut)
- College: Mississippi Gulf Coast CC (2009–2010); Georgia (2011–2012)
- NFL draft: 2013: 3rd round, 82nd overall pick

Career history
- New Orleans Saints (2013–2016); Seattle Seahawks (2016); Chicago Bears (2017); New York Giants (2018); Miami Dolphins (2019); Chicago Bears (2020); Miami Dolphins (2021–2022); Las Vegas Raiders (2023–2024); Baltimore Ravens (2025–present)

Awards and highlights
- Second-team All-SEC (2012)

Career NFL statistics as of Week 10, 2026
- Total tackles: 370
- Sacks: 5.5
- Forced fumbles: 3
- Fumble recoveries: 3
- Pass deflections: 11
- Defensive touchdowns: 1
- Stats at Pro Football Reference

Johnathan Jenkins (born July 11, 1989) is an American professional football nose tackle for the Baltimore Ravens of the National Football League (NFL). He played college football for the Georgia Bulldogs and was selected by the New Orleans Saints in the third round of the 2013 NFL draft. He has also played for the Seattle Seahawks, Chicago Bears, New York Giants, Miami Dolphins, and Las Vegas Raiders.

== Early life ==
A native of Meriden, Connecticut, Jenkins attended Francis T. Maloney High School, where he was a member of the Maloney Spartans high school football team. He played defensive end and also occasionally appeared as fullback on short-and-goal situations (scoring four touchdowns as a senior). Jenkins then attended Mississippi Gulf Coast Community College in Perkinston, Mississippi, where he recorded 41 tackles and two quarterback sacks as a sophomore. Gulf Coast had a 19–5 record in his two seasons there.

== College career ==
Jenkins received an athletic scholarship to attend the University of Georgia, and played for coach Mark Richt's Georgia Bulldogs football team in 2011 and 2012. He was recruited by Richt to man the nose tackle position in Georgia's 3–4 defense, rotating with Kwame Geathers in the position.

== Professional career ==
Pre-draft measurables
Height	Weight	Arm length	Hand span	Wingspan	40-yard dash	10-yard split	20-yard split	20-yard shuttle	Three-cone drill	Vertical jump	Broad jump	Bench press
6 ft 3 5/8 in (1.92 m)	346 lb (157 kg)	34 in (0.86 m)	9 1/2 in (0.24 m)	6 ft 9 1/8 in (2.06 m)	5.20 s	1.81 s	3.01 s	4.94 s	7.80 s	24.5 in (0.62 m)	8 ft 4 in (2.54 m)	30 reps
All values from NFL Combine/Pro Day.

=== New Orleans Saints ===
Jenkins was drafted in the third round, with the 82nd overall pick, by the New Orleans Saints in the 2013 NFL draft. Jenkins was signed by the Saints on May 10 to a four-year contract, the last of the 5 New Orleans picks to sign.

He was released by the Saints on November 9, 2016.

=== Seattle Seahawks ===
On November 15, 2016, Jenkins was signed by the Seattle Seahawks.

=== Chicago Bears (first stint) ===
On March 17, 2017, Jenkins signed with the Chicago Bears. He played in eight games for the Bears in 2017.

On April 7, 2018, Jenkins re-signed with the Bears on a one-year contract. He was released on September 1, 2018.

=== New York Giants ===
On September 4, 2018, Jenkins was signed by the New York Giants.

On May 13, 2019, Jenkins re-signed with the Giants. He was released on August 31, 2019.

=== Miami Dolphins (first stint) ===
On September 2, 2019, Jenkins was signed by the Miami Dolphins.

=== Chicago Bears (second stint) ===
On April 28, 2020, Jenkins signed a one-year deal with the Bears. He was placed on the reserve/COVID-19 list by the Bears on July 30, and activated from the list four days later. He was placed on injured reserve on September 24, and was activated on October 16.

=== Miami Dolphins (second stint) ===
Jenkins signed with the Dolphins on April 2, 2021. He re-signed with the team for another season on April 7, 2022.

=== Las Vegas Raiders ===
On March 24, 2023, Jenkins signed with the Las Vegas Raiders. On December 14, against the Los Angeles Chargers, Jenkins recovered a fumble and returned it for his first career touchdown in the Raiders' 63–21 win. He started all 17 games in 2023, recording a career-high 61 tackles, four passes defensed and one sack.

On March 18, 2024, Jenkins re-signed with the Raiders.

=== Baltimore Ravens ===
On May 16, 2025, Jenkins signed with the Baltimore Ravens. After Nnamdi Madubuike suffered a season-ending neck injury early in the year, Jenkins assumed an expanded role as the Ravens’ primary nose tackle. As a result, on January 2, 2026, Jenkins signed the first contract extension of his career with the Ravens—a one-year deal worth $2 million.

== NFL career statistics ==
Legend
	Led the league
**Bold**	Career high

=== Regular season ===
Year	Team	Games		Tackles					Interceptions					Fumbles			
Year	Team	GP	GS	Cmb	Solo	Ast	Sck	TFL	Int	Yds	TD	Lng	PD	FF	FR	Yds	TD
2013	NOR	16	5	21	13	8	0.0	2	0	0	0	0	0	0	0	0	0
2014	NOR	12	4	30	20	10	**1.0**	3	0	0	0	0	1	0	0	0	0
2015	NOR	14	12	49	23	26	0.5	1	0	0	0	0	1	1	**1**	0	0
2016	NOR	7	1	10	6	4	0.0	0	0	0	0	0	0	0	0	0	0
2016	SEA	2	0	3	0	3	0.0	0	0	0	0	0	0	0	0	0	0
2017	CHI	8	1	8	5	3	0.0	0	0	0	0	0	0	0	0	0	0
2018	NYG	7	0	0	0	0	0.0	0	0	0	0	0	0	0	0	0	0
2019	MIA	16	5	34	20	14	**1.0**	2	0	0	0	0	1	0	0	0	0
2020	CHI	11	0	21	7	14	0.0	0	0	0	0	0	1	0	0	0	0
2021	MIA	7	2	16	10	6	0.0	0	0	0	0	0	0	0	0	0	0
2022	MIA	16	0	20	8	12	0.0	0	0	0	0	0	0	0	0	0	0
2023	LVR	**17**	**17**	**61**	**24**	**37**	**1.0**	**4**	0	0	0	0	**4**	0	**1**	**44**	**1**
2024	LVR	**17**	**17**	46	13	33	**1.0**	3	0	0	0	0	2	0	0	0	0
2025	BAL	**17**	14	39	16	23	**1.0**	3	0	0	0	0	1	**2**	**1**	13	0
2026	BAL	10	0	12	6	6	0.0	1	0	0	0	0	0	0	0	0	0
Total		177	78	370	171	199	5.5	19	0	0	0	0	11	3	3	57	1

=== Playoffs ===
Year	Team	Games		Tackles					Interceptions					Fumbles			
Year	Team	GP	GS	Cmb	Solo	Ast	Sck	TFL	Int	Yds	TD	Lng	PD	FF	FR	Yds	TD
2013	NOR	**2**	0	**5**	**5**	0	**1.0**	0	0	0	0	0	0	0	0	0	0
2016	SEA	1	0	1	1	0	0.0	0	0	0	0	0	0	0	0	0	0
2020	CHI	1	0	1	1	0	0.0	0	0	0	0	0	0	0	**1**	0	0
2022	MIA	1	0	1	1	0	0.0	0	0	0	0	0	0	0	0	0	0
Total		5	0	8	8	0	1.0	0	0	0	0	0	0	0	1	0	0
