= John C. Coffee =

American lawyer (born 1944)

- Born: John C. Coffee Jr. November 15, 1944 (age 81); Albany, New York
- Education: Amherst College (BA); Yale Law School (LLB); New York University (LLM)
- Spouse: Jane Purcell (died 2022)
- Children: 1
- Scientific career
- Fields: Business law; Tax law
- Workplaces: Columbia Law School

John C. Coffee Jr. (born November 15, 1944) is the Adolf A. Berle Professor of Law and director of the Center on Corporate Governance at Columbia Law School.

== Early life and education ==
Coffee grew up in Manhasset, New York. He is of Irish descent. He attended Manhasset High School where he was in the National Honor Society. After graduation, he attended Amherst College with his high school friend and classmate, actor Ken Howard.

He received his B.A. from Amherst College in 1966. He then received his LL.B. from Yale Law School in 1969 and later an LL.M. (in taxation) from New York University School of Law.

== Career ==
Following graduation from law school, Coffee was a Reginald Heber Smith fellow for one year, doing poverty law litigation in New York City. He entered private practice as an attorney at Cravath, Swaine & Moore from 1970 to 1976. He has also served as Reporter for the American Bar Association for its Model Standards on Sentencing Alternatives and Procedures and for the American Law Institute's Principles of Corporate Governance. From 1976 to 1980, he was a professor at Georgetown University Law Center before coming to Columbia. He was also a visiting professor at Harvard Law School (2001), Stanford University Law School (1988), the University of Virginia Law School (1978), and the University of Michigan Law School (1979).

Coffee has been listed by the National Law Journal as one of the "100 Most Influential Lawyers in the United States" several times since 2000. He has been quoted by The New York Times, The Wall Street Journal and other major media outlets, such as Fox News and CNN, in their corporate and securities reporting. He has also written a casebook on U.S. securities regulation, as well as another on corporations. Coffee is the most cited law professor in law reviews in the combined corporate, commercial, and business law field.

== Personal life ==
Coffee lives in New Jersey. His wife, Jane, who was a professor of Mathematics at the College of Staten Island, died in 2022. They have one daughter, who is a physician.

On August 10, 2011, Coffee was a guest on The Daily Show with Jon Stewart.

== Publications ==
Books

- 1988 (with Lowenstein and Rose-Ackerman). Knights, Raiders and Targets: The Impact of the Hostile Takeover.
- 2004 (with Klein). Business Organization and Finance: Legal and Economic Principles, 9th ed.
- 2008 (with Choper and Gilson). Cases and Materials on Corporations, 7th ed.
- 2012 (with Hillary A. Sale). Securities Regulation: Cases and Materials, 12th ed.
- 2020. Corporate Crime and Punishment: The Crisis of Underenforcement, Berrett-Koehler Publishers, ISBN 978-1523088850.

Articles

- 'Rescuing the Private Attorney General: Why the Model of the Lawyer as Bounty Hunter is Not Working' (1983) vol. 42 Issue 2 Michigan Law Review 215 Maryland Law Review.
- 'Shareholders Versus Managers: The Strain in the Corporate Web' (1986) 85 Michigan Law Review 1 doi:10.2307/1288884. JSTOR 1288884.
- 'Hail Britannia?: Institutional Investor Behavior Under Limited Regulation' (1994) 92(7) Michigan Law Review 1997-2087 (with Bernard S. Black) doi:10.2307/1289659. JSTOR 1289659. SSRN 276991.
- 'The Future as History: The Prospects for Global Convergence in Corporate Governance and its Implications', (1999) 93 Northwestern University Law Review 643..
- 2000 'The Rise of Dispersed Ownership: The Role of Law in the Separation of Ownership and Control' Columbia Law and Economics Working Paper No. 182. doi:10.2139/ssrn.254097. SSRN 254097.
- 2001 'Do Norms Matter?: A Cross-Country Examination of the Private Benefits of Control' Columbia Law and Economics Working Paper No. 183. doi:10.2307/3312908. JSTOR 3312908. SSRN 257613.
- 2002 'Understanding Enron: It's About the Gatekeepers, Stupid' Columbia Law & Economics 56(4) Working Paper No. 207. doi:10.2139/ssrn.325240. SSRN 325240.
- 2006 'Reforming the Securities Class Action: An Essay on Deterrence and its Implementation' Columbia Law and Economics Working Paper No. 293. 106(7). SSRN 893833. doi:10.2139/ssrn.893833. JSTOR 40041679.
- 2008 'Redesigning the SEC: Does the Treasury Have a Better Idea?' Columbia Law and Economics Working Paper No. 342. (with Hillary A. Sale). SSRN 1309776.
- 2010 'Dispersed Ownership: The Theories, the Evidence, and the Enduring Tension Between 'Lumpers' and 'Splitters' Columbia Law and Economics Working Paper No. 363. doi:10.2139/ssrn.1532922. SSRN 1532922.
