= P. J. Volker =

American football coach (born 1983)

P.J. Volker
Personal information
- Born: 1983 (age 42–43); Cincinnati, Ohio, U.S.

Career information
- Position: Linebacker
- High school: Elder (Cincinnati)
- College: Mount St. Joseph University

Career history
- Thiel (2006–2007) Assistant running backs coach & recruiting coordinator; Thomas More (2008–2009) Linebackers coach & recruiting coordinator; Indiana State (2010–2012) Linebackers coach & recruiting coordinator; Georgia State (2013–2016) Linebackers coach & recruiting coordinator; Kennesaw State (2017–2018) Linebackers coach; Navy (2019–2025) Defensive coordinator; Baltimore Ravens (2026–present) Safeties coach

P. J. Volker (born 1983) is an American football coach who currently serves as the safeties coach for the Baltimore Ravens of the National Football League (NFL). Volker was hired by the Ravens in 2026 by head coach Jesse Minter after previously serving as the defensive coordinator of the Navy Midshipmen.

== Personal life ==
P.J. Volker was born in 1983 in Cincinnati, Ohio. Volker graduated from Elder High School in 2001. Volker played college football at Mount St. Joseph University in Ohio, where he played linebacker. He was a three-time team captain and a two-time All-Heartland Conference selection.

Volker is married to his wife Amanda Naseef and has two daughters.

== Coaching career ==
=== Thiel ===
Volker was hired by Thiel College in 2006 as an assistant running backs coach and a recruiting coordinator, his first coaching job of his career.

=== Thomas More ===
Volker joined Thomas Mores Staff in 2008 as a linebackers coach and recruiting coordinator.

=== Indiana State ===
Volker joined the Indiana State staff in 2010, as a linebackers coach. In 2011, linebackers Aaron Archie, Jacolby Washington, and Ryan Roberts were named to the All-Missouri Valley Conference Team.

=== Georgia State ===
Volker joined the Georgia State program in 2013, following the former Indiana State head coach Trent Miles, after his exit from the program in 2012. During his time with Georgia State, Georgia State led the nation by allowing 15 points fewer per game than in 2014 and improving by 122.3 yards per game and 1.92 yards per carry against the run. The Panthers finished in the top four in the Sun Belt in scoring defense (28.3 points per game), total defense (405.6 yards per game), rushing defense (181.4 yards per game) and pass efficiency defense (120.3). Volker coached linebacker Joseph Peterson, a three-time all-conference selection and the Panthers all-time leading tackler. Volker was a part of the staff that led Georgia State to its first Bowl appearance in program history in 2015.

=== Kennesaw State ===
Volker joined Kennesaw States staff on March 8, 2017, replacing Andrew Thacker. In his first season at Kennesaw State, the Owls defense held teams to 15.5 points per game to rank 7th nationally in 2018. Volker helped in the development of former All-American Bryson Armstrong.

=== Navy ===
Volker joined the Navy Midshipmen defensive staff as their defensive coordinator and linebackers coach in 2019, following his exit from Kennesaw State. In 2019, the Midshipmen finished 10–3, with wins over the Air-Force and Army to win the Commander-In-Chiefs Trophy. That 2020 season was the programs sixth time in school history they finished with 10 wins or more. In 2024, the Midshipmen defeated Oklahoma 21–20 to win the Armed Forces Bowl.

=== Baltimore Ravens ===
On February 2, 2026, the Baltimore Ravens hired Volker as their safeties coach under newly hired head coach Jesse Minter.
