= Herma Hill Kay =

Professor of Law at UC Berkeley specializing in family law

9th Dean of UC Berkeley School of Law
- In office 1992–2000
- Preceded by: Jesse Choper
- Succeeded by: John P. Dwyer

Personal details
- Born: August 18, 1934 Orangeburg, South Carolina
- Died: June 10, 2017 (aged 82) San Francisco, California
- Education: Southern Methodist University B.A. 1956; University of Chicago J.D. 1959
- Occupation: Professor; Lawyer; Administrator
- Website: https://www.law.berkeley.edu/php-programs/faculty/facultyProfile.php?facID=64

Herma Hill Kay (August 18, 1934 – June 10, 2017) was the Barbara Nachtrieb Armstrong Professor of Law at UC Berkeley School of Law (Boalt Hall). She previously served as dean of Boalt from 1992 to 2000. She specialized in family law and conflict of laws.

== Biography ==
Kay was born in Orangeburg, South Carolina in 1934 to a third-grade teacher mother, Herma Lee Crawford, and an Army chaplain father, Charles Esdorn Hill. She studied English at Southern Methodist University and graduated magna cum laude in 1956. At SMU, she was inducted into Phi Beta Kappa. She then attended law school at the University of Chicago, graduating third in her class in 1959. After law school, she clerked for one year for Justice Roger Traynor of the California Supreme Court. She joined the faculty at Boalt Hall in 1960 and became dean of that faculty in 1992. Kay died on June 10, 2017, at the age of 82.

== Works, honors, and recognition ==
In 1966, Kay served on the California Governor's Commission on the Family, which proposed that California adopt a no-fault regime for divorce. The state of California adopted a law based on that recommendation, the first of its kind in the United States, in 1970. Along with Robert Levy, she was co-reporter of the committee that prepared the Uniform Marriage and Divorce Act.

In 1969, Kay, along with Ruth Bader Ginsburg and Kenneth M. Davidson, authored the first casebook on sex discrimination, Sex-Based Discrimination: Text, Cases, and Materials (West, 1969).

In 1985, Kay was elected to the Council of the American Law Institute. She was elected to the American Academy of Arts and Sciences in 1989. Kay was president of the Association of American Law Schools in 1989 and secretary of the American Bar Association Section on Legal Education and Admissions to the Bar from 1999 to 2001. In 2000, she became a member of the American Philosophical Society. She received 1992 Margaret Brent Award to Women Lawyers of Distinction and the 2003 Boalt Hall Alumni Association Faculty Lifetime Achievement Award.

Kay has also been recognized for her teaching, receiving the UC Berkeley Distinguished Teaching Award, in 1962, and the Society of American Law Teachers Teaching Award.

In 1999, the Boalt Hall Women's Association created a fellowship in Kay's name to support students pursuing "public interest work benefiting women."

Berkeley established the Herma Hill Kay Memorial Lecture series; the inaugural speaker was U.S. Supreme Court Justice (and friend of Kay's) Ruth Bader Ginsburg.

== Selected works ==
Articles

- "Same-Sex Divorce in the Conflict of Laws," 15 Kings College L.J. 63 (2004).
- "'Making Marriage and Divorce Safe for Women' Revisited," 32 Hofstra L. Rev. 71 (2003).
- "U.C.'s Women Law Faculty," 36 U.C. Davis L. Rev. 331 (2003).
- "Women Law School Deans: A Different Breed, Or Just One Of The Boys?" 14 Yale J. L. & Feminism 219 (2002).
- "No-Fault Divorce and Child Custody: Chilling Out the Gender Wars," 36 Fam. L. Q. 27 (2002).
- "The Challenge to Diversity in Legal Education," 34 Ind. L. Rev. 55 (2000).
- "From the Second Sex to the Joint Venture: An Overview of Women's Rights and Family Law in the United States During the Twentieth Century," 88 Calif.L.Rev. 2017 (December 2000).
- "Adoption in the Conflict of Laws: The UAA, Not the UCCJA, Is the Answer," 84 Calif.L.Rev. 703 (1996).
- "Beyond No-Fault: New Directions in Divorce Reform," in (S. Sugarman & H.H. Kay, eds.) Divorce Reform at the Crossroads 6–36 (Yale Univ. Press, 1990).
- "An Appraisal of California's No-Fault Divorce Law," 75 Calif.L.Rev. 291 (1987).
- "Equality and Difference: The Case of Pregnancy," 1 Berkeley Women's L.J. 1 (1985).
- "Marvin v. Marvin: Preserving the Options," 65 Calif.L.Rev. 937 (1977) (with Carol Amyx).
- "Making Marriage and Divorce Safe for Women" — review of M. Rheinstein, Marriage Stability, Divorce and the Law in 60 Calif.L.Rev. 1683 (1972).

Casebooks

- Kenneth M. Davidson, Ruth Bader Ginsburg, and Herma Hill Kay, Sex-Based Discrimination: Text, Cases, and Materials (West, 1969)
