= Zion Young =

American football player (born 2004)

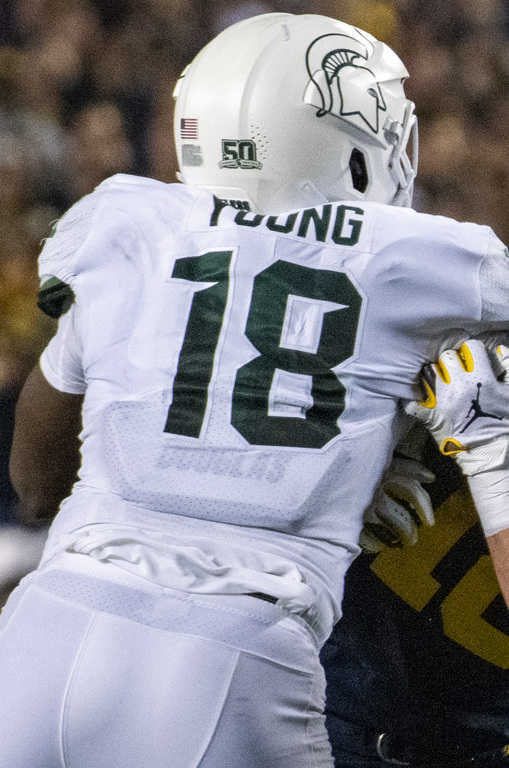
- Young with the Michigan State Spartans in 2022

No. 9 – Baltimore Ravens
- Position: Outside linebacker
- Roster status: Active

Personal information
- Born: March 18, 2004 (age 22); Atlanta, Georgia, U.S.
- Listed height: 6 ft 6 in (1.98 m)
- Listed weight: 267 lb (121 kg)

Career information
- High school: Westlake (Atlanta)
- College: Michigan State (2022–2023); Missouri (2024–2025)
- NFL draft: 2026: 2nd round, 45th overall pick

Career history
- Baltimore Ravens (2026–present)

Awards and highlights
- First-team All-SEC (2025)

Career NFL statistics as of Week 10, 2026
- Tackles: 15
- Stats at Pro Football Reference

Zion Young (born March 18, 2004) is an American professional football outside linebacker for the Baltimore Ravens of the National Football League (NFL). He played college football for the Michigan State Spartans and Missouri Tigers and was selected by the Ravens in the second round of the 2026 NFL draft.

== Early life ==
Young was born on March 18, 2004 in Atlanta, Georgia. He attended Westlake High School in Atlanta. He committed to Michigan State University to play college football.

== College career ==
Young played at Michigan State from 2022 to 2023. On October 29th, 2022, Young was involved in a post game altercation with a Michigan Wolverines player. Young was charged with misdemeanor assault, and entered into a pre-plea diversion program in 2023 to work toward his charge being dropped. In two years at Michigan State, he started 11 of 20 games, recording 47 tackles and 2.5 sacks. After the 2023 season, Young transferred to the University of Missouri. In his first year at Missouri in 2024 he started all 13 games and had 42 tackles and 2.5 sacks. He returned to Missouri for his senior season in 2025. On December 13, 2025, Young was arrested, and later charged, for driving while intoxicated and speeding.

== Professional career ==
Pre-draft measurables
Height	Weight	Arm length	Hand span	Wingspan	40-yard dash	10-yard split	20-yard split	Vertical jump	Broad jump
6 ft 5 3/4 in (1.97 m)	262 lb (119 kg)	33 in (0.84 m)	9 1/2 in (0.24 m)	6 ft 9 3/8 in (2.07 m)	4.75 s	1.72 s	2.76 s	31.0 in (0.79 m)	9 ft 9 in (2.97 m)
All values from NFL Combine/Pro Day

Young was selected by the Baltimore Ravens with the 45th overall pick in the second round of the 2026 NFL draft.

== Career statistics ==
=== NFL ===
Year	Team	Games		Tackles					Interceptions						Fumbles				
Year	Team	GP	GS	Cmb	Solo	Ast	Sck	TFL	Int	Yds	Avg	Lng	TD	PD	FF	Fmb	FR	Yds	TD
2026	BAL	9	9	13	7	8	0.0	0	0	0	0.0	0	0	0	0	0	0	0	0
Career		9	9	13	7	8	0.0	0	0	0	0.0	0	0	0	0	0	0	0	0
