= Jesse Choper =

American constitutional law scholar

Jesse H. Choper

8th Dean of the UC Berkeley School of Law
- In office 1982–1992
- Preceded by: Sanford H. Kadish
- Succeeded by: Herma Hill Kay

Personal details
- Born: 1935 (age 90–91) Wilkes-Barre, Pennsylvania, U.S.
- Spouse: Mari Smith Choper
- Parent(s): Edward Choper & Dorothy Resnick
- Education: Wilkes University (BA); University of Pennsylvania (JD)
- Profession: Professor

Jesse Herbert Choper is an American constitutional law scholar and a former Dean of the University of California, Berkeley, School of Law, where he serves as the Earl Warren Professor of Public Law Emeritus.

== Biography ==
Choper was born in Wilkes-Barre, Pennsylvania, to Dorothy Resnick and Edward Choper. He attended Wilkes University, receiving a B.A. in 1957. He then studied at the University of Pennsylvania School of Law, graduating Order of the Coif in 1960 while teaching courses at the Wharton School. After law school, he clerked for Chief Justice Earl Warren of the Supreme Court of the United States during the 1960 Term.

Following his clerkship, in 1961 Choper joined the faculty at the University of Minnesota Law School. In 1965, he began teaching constitutional law, corporate law, and other subjects at UC Berkeley School of Law, and served as dean from 1982 to 1992. During his career, Choper has served as visiting professor at Harvard Law School, Fordham Law School, and several European universities. In November 2015, he retired from teaching.

== Other ==
Choper has co-authored two case books on constitutional law, and one on corporate law called Choper, Coffee, Gilson. He is widely cited in the press as an expert on free speech and the constitution.

Choper is a member of the American Law Institute. In 2012, he was awarded the Bernard E. Witkin Medal by the California State Bar.

Since 2006, he has served as a member of the California Horse Racing Board.

== Personal life ==
Choper is married to Mari Smith Choper. They have two sons and one grandson.

== See also ==
- List of law clerks for the chief justice of the United States

== Selected publications ==
=== Books ===
- Choper, Jesse H. Judicial Review and the National Political Process: A Functional Reconsideration of the Role of the Supreme Court (Chicago: The University of Chicago Press, 1980). ISBN 978-0-226-10443-0
- Securing Religious Liberty: Principles for Judicial Interpretation of the Religion Clauses (Chicago: The University of Chicago Press, 1995). ISBN 978-0-226-10445-4

=== Casebooks ===
- Choper, Jesse; Fallon Jr, Richard; Kamisar, Yale; Shiffrin, Steven. Constitutional Law: Cases Comments and Questions (Eagan, Minn.; West Publishing) (American Casebook Series)(12th edition). ISBN 978-0-314-90468-3
- Choper, Jesse; Shiffrin, Steven. The First Amendment, Cases--Comments--Questions. (Eagan, Minn.; West Publishing) (American Casebook Series)(6th edition). ISBN 978-1-63459-743-2
- Choper, Jesse H.; Coffee Jr, John C.; Gilson, Ronald J. Cases and Materials on Corporations (Wolters Kluwer, 2012)(8th Edition). ISBN 978-1-4548-0296-9
