= Sanford Kadish =

American criminologist (1921–2014)

7th Dean of UC Berkeley School of Law
- In office 1975–1982
- Preceded by: Edward C. Halbach, Jr.
- Succeeded by: Jesse Choper

Personal details
- Born: September 7, 1921 New York City
- Died: September 5, 2014
- Spouse: June Kadish
- Education: City College of New York, Columbia Law School
- Occupation: Professor

Sanford "Sandy" H. Kadish (September 7, 1921 – September 5, 2014) was an American criminal law scholar and theorist. He specialised in criminology and criminal law theory, and was one of the drafters of the American Model Penal Code.

== Biography ==
Sanford Harold Kadish was born in 1921 in New York City, and grew up in the Bronx. He graduated from City College of New York, Phi Beta Kappa, and then attended a Japanese language school in Colorado.

He served as an officer in the United States Navy during World War II on a destroyer in the Pacific, translating Japanese military documents, until he was discharged in 1946. Kadish earned his law degree from Columbia Law School in 1948; during that time he studied with professors Herb Wechsler and Walter Gellhorn, who were influential on his career and scholarship. After law school, he practiced privately in New York before entering legal academia in 1951 at the University of Utah Law School, where he taught for ten years. He then joined the University of Michigan in 1961, before he joined UC Berkeley School of Law in 1964, where he stayed until his retirement in 1999. He served as Berkeley Law's Dean from 1975 to 1982, and continued to serve as emeritus faculty (the Alexander F. and May T. Morrison Professor of Law (Emeritus)) after his retirement in 1999.

During his years in academia, he worked with Wechsler on the ALI's Model Penal Code, which was to prove hugely influential in reforming American criminal law. He also published the first edition of his criminal law casebook, Criminal Law and Its Processes, which was the leading criminal law casebook for many decades.

== Scholarship ==
Kadish was renowned as "the preeminent criminal law scholar of his generation", "America's foremost scholar of the criminal law", and "the dean of American criminal law academicians". He has been described as "the leading scholar in ... criminal law theory", who was largely responsible for shaping the field.

In his scholarship and his work on legal reform, Kadish applied a sociological lens to criminal law and criminology. Kadish authored the leading criminal law casebook (Criminal Law and Its Processes, first published in 1962) and the first comprehensive encyclopedia of criminal law (The Encyclopedia of Crime and Justice, first published in 1983).

Kadish is particularly cited for a number of contributions, including:

- criticizing the criminalization of so-called "victimless crimes", which led to removal of most such crimes from the Model Penal Code
- providing impetus to the sentencing reform movement with an article on criminal procedure, "Legal Norm and Discretion in the Police and Sentencing Process", 75 Harv. L. Rev. 904 (1962)
- a highly cited article on due process, "Methodology and Criteria in Due Process Adjudication -- A Survey and Criticism", 66 Yale L.J. 319 (1957)
- scholarship on excuses and exceptions in criminal law, including several articles and ultimately a formulation in his criminal law casebook that shaped the treatment of this topic in all subsequent casebooks
- studies of the codification of law, beginning with his contributions to the Model Penal Code
- his influential casebook, Criminal Law and Its Processes, which "took the field of criminal law class materials by storm, revolutionized the prevalent approach to teaching the first-year course, and projected a vision of the subject matter that deservedly dominated the field." "With the possible exception of the American Law Institute's Model Penal Code, these materials are the single most influential document in shaping the study and the teaching of criminal law in America today."

== Academic service and awards ==
At different times, Kadish was president of the Association of American Law Schools (AALS) and the American Association of University Professors (AAUP), and Vice-President of the American Academy of Arts & Sciences. During the 1950s Kadish served as an arbitrator with the Regional Wage Stabilization Board (1951–53).

Kadish was a Fulbright Lecturer in 1957 at the University of Melbourne, Australia. In 1974 Kadish was a Guggenheim Fellow. While dean, Kadish helped institute the Jurisprudence and Social Policy Program, one of the first of its kind. In 2003, Kadish and his wife endowed the Kadish Center for Morality, Law and Public Affairs, fostering continued scholarship in the ethics and policy of criminal law, and in legal and moral reasoning generally.

== Personal life ==
Kadish was the son of Frances R. Kadish. Kadish co-authored some work with his brother, Mortimer Kadish, a philosopher. He was married to June Kadish (1922-2011) for 68 years, with whom he had two sons, Josh and Peter Kadish.

== Bibliography ==
Books

- Criminal Law and Its Processes: Cases and Materials, first published 1962, with Monrad G. Paulsen; 9th edition published 2012, with Stephen J. Schulhofer, Carol S. Steiker, and Rachel E. Barkow.
- Ed., The Encyclopedia of Crime and Justice (Free Press, 1983)
- Blame and Punishment: Essays in the Criminal Law (1987) (collection of a number of previously published pieces)
- M. Kadish & S. Kadish, Discretion to Disobey: A Study of Lawful Departures from Legal Rules (1973); later, M Kadish, S Kadish, MR Kadish, SH Kadish (2012)

Selected articles

- "Methodology and Criteria in Due Process Adjudication. A Survey and Criticism", Yale Law Journal, 1957 ("one of the top hundred most cited law review articles of all time", according to Christopher Kutz
- "Legal Norm and Discretion in the Police and Sentencing Process", 75 Harv. L. Rev. 904 (1962)
- "Some Observations on the Use of Criminal Sanctions in Enforcing Economic Regulations", The University of Chicago Law Review, 1963
- "The Crisis of Overcriminalization", 374 Annals Am. Acad. Pol. & Soc. Sci. 157 (1967); 7 American Criminal Law Quarterly 17 (1968)
- Sanford H. Kadish, "The Decline of Innocence", 26 Cambridge L.J. 273 (1968)
- "Why Substantive Criminal Law: A Dialogue", 29 Clev. St. L. Rev. 1 (1980)

Bibliographies and tributes

- "Professor Sanford H. Kadish's Scholarship", Ohio State Journal of Criminal Law
- Eddie Yeghiayan, "Sanford H. Kadish Bibliography", UCHRI Bibliographies, UCI Dept. of Logic and Philosophy of Science
- California Law Review, v. 70, n.3 (May 1982) - Volume dedicated to Sanford Kadish, including several review and tribute articles
