= Francis T. Maloney High School =

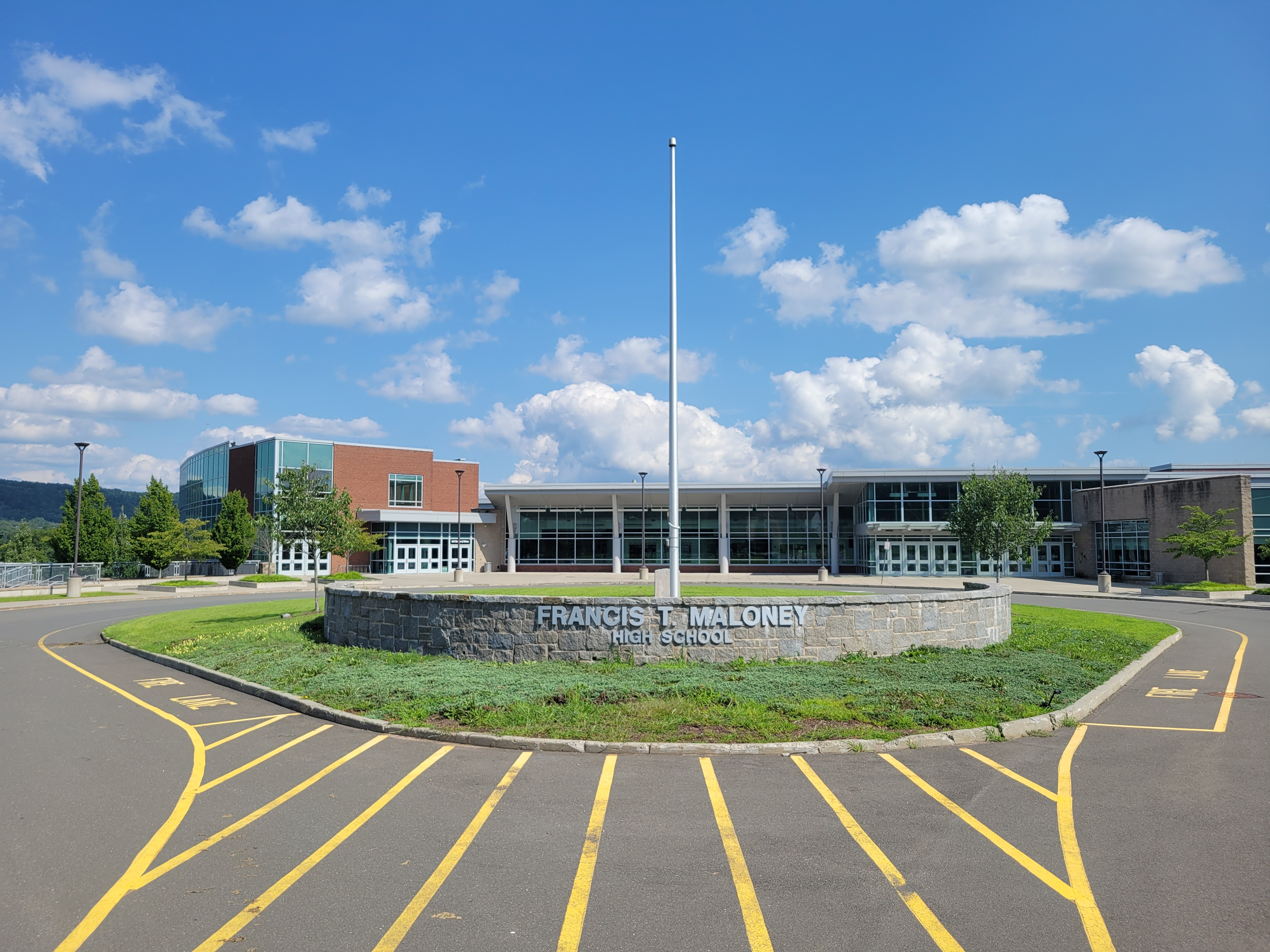

Location
- 121 Gravel Street; Meriden, Connecticut 06450; United States; 41°31′54″N 72°46′21″W

Information
- Type: Public school
- School district: Meriden Public Schools
- Superintendent: Mark D. Benigni
- CEEB code: 070382
- Principal: Jennifer Straub
- Staff: 85.34 (FTE)
- Grades: 9–12
- Enrollment: 1,301 (2023–2024)
- Student to teacher ratio: 15.24
- Colors: Green and white
- Team name: Spartans
- Rivals: O.H. Platt High School
- Website: www.maloneyhs.com

Francis T. Maloney High School is a public school located in Meriden, Connecticut. The student body makeup is 51 percent male and 49 percent female, and the total minority enrollment is 64 percent. Francis T. Maloney High School is 1 of 2 high schools in the Meriden School District.

On Jun 27, 2013, ground broke on a $107.5 million construction project to renovate the school. The project provided a renovated-as-new facility at Maloney that measures approximately 260,000 square feet and included a fully renovated pool, auditorium and a brand-new wing. The work on the massive project completed in late 2016.

== Athletics ==
Maloney High School is part of the Central Connecticut Conference (CCC) which features member schools in the Greater Hartford region of Connecticut, United States.

The athletic program also has produced Jonathan Jenkins, a defensive lineman currently playing professionally for the Las Vegas Raiders.

=== State Championship ===
On December 11, 2021, Maloney won the first state football title in program and Meriden history as the Spartans captured the Class L state championship with a 35-21 win over Windsor at Veterans Memorial Stadium. The Spartans did it with four interceptions and a memorable performance by running back Josh Boganski. The junior ran for 249 yards on 46 carries with touchdown runs of 5, 6, 12 and 5 yards. Quarterback Angel Arce added a game-icing 15-yard TD run before the Spartans raised the championship plaque on the wet turf.

=== No.1 Ranking ===
On November 7, 2022, Maloney were ranked No. 1 in state polls for the first time in the 65 years of Maloney football history. The Spartans were voted No. 1 by 21 of the 24 voters in the GameTime CT media poll and by seven of 13 voters in the Day of New London coaches poll. The achievement was the result of a dramatic 31-28 double-overtime victory at Falcon Field over previous No. 1 Southington.

=== Basketball ===
The Spartans bested bordering Lyman Hall 54-46 on March 15, 2008, in the Class L final at Gampel Pavilion on the UConn campus in front of 5,200 fans. Vereen was the MVP in Maloney’s championship win over Lyman Hall. He totaled 22 points and went 8-of-17 from the floor. He also had a game-high four steals, including a big one down the stretch.

== Notable alumni ==
- Beau Billingslea, Actor
- Jennifer DiNoia, American Singer and Stage Actress
- Rob Hyman, Musician
- John Jenkins, NFL player
- Jay Murphy, Former NBA Player
- Rob Sampson, politician
- Rob Jachym, MLS Soccer Player
