= Ty Pezza =

American football player (born 2002)

No. 84 – Baltimore Ravens
- Position: Tight end
- Roster status: Practice squad

Personal information
- Born: September 18, 2002 (age 24); North Kingstown, Rhode Island, U.S.
- Listed height: 6 ft 3 in (1.91 m)
- Listed weight: 240 lb (109 kg)

Career information
- High school: North Kingstown (North Kingstown, Rhode Island)
- College: Brown (2022–2025)
- NFL draft: 2026: undrafted

Career history
- Baltimore Ravens (2026–present)*
- * Offseason or practice squad member only

Awards and highlights
- Second-team All-Ivy League (2025)
- Stats at Pro Football Reference

Tyler Pezza (born September 18, 2002) is an American football tight end for the Baltimore Ravens of the National Football League (NFL). He played college football for the Brown Bears.

== Early life and high school ==
Pezza grew up in North Kingstown, Rhode Island and attended North Kingstown High School. He had 148 receptions for 2,285 yards and 22 touchdowns playing at North Kingstown. Pezza enrolled at the Phillips Exeter Academy for a postgraduate year.

== College career ==
Pezza played college football for the Brown Bears as a wide receiver and on special teams. He was named second-team All-Ivy League as a senior after catching 46 passes for 599 yards and seven touchdowns. Pezza finished his college career with 87 receptions for 959 yards and nine touchdowns while also making 24 tackles on special teams.

== Professional career ==
Pre-draft measurables
Height	Weight	Arm length	Hand span	Wingspan	40-yard dash	10-yard split	20-yard split	20-yard shuttle	Three-cone drill	Vertical jump	Broad jump	Bench press
6 ft 3 3/8 in (1.91 m)	234 lb (106 kg)	32 in (0.81 m)	10 in (0.25 m)	6 ft 7 3/4 in (2.03 m)	4.70 s	1.60 s	2.61 s	4.32 s	6.93 s	32.0 in (0.81 m)	9 ft 11 in (3.02 m)	18 reps
All values from Pro Day

Pezza was signed by the Baltimore Ravens as an undrafted free agent on April 30, 2026. He was converted from wide receiver to tight end after signing. Pezza was waived by the Ravens on August 30, as a part of final roster cuts at the end of training camp; he was re-signed to the team's practice squad the following day.
