= O.H. Platt High School =

Orville H. Platt High School
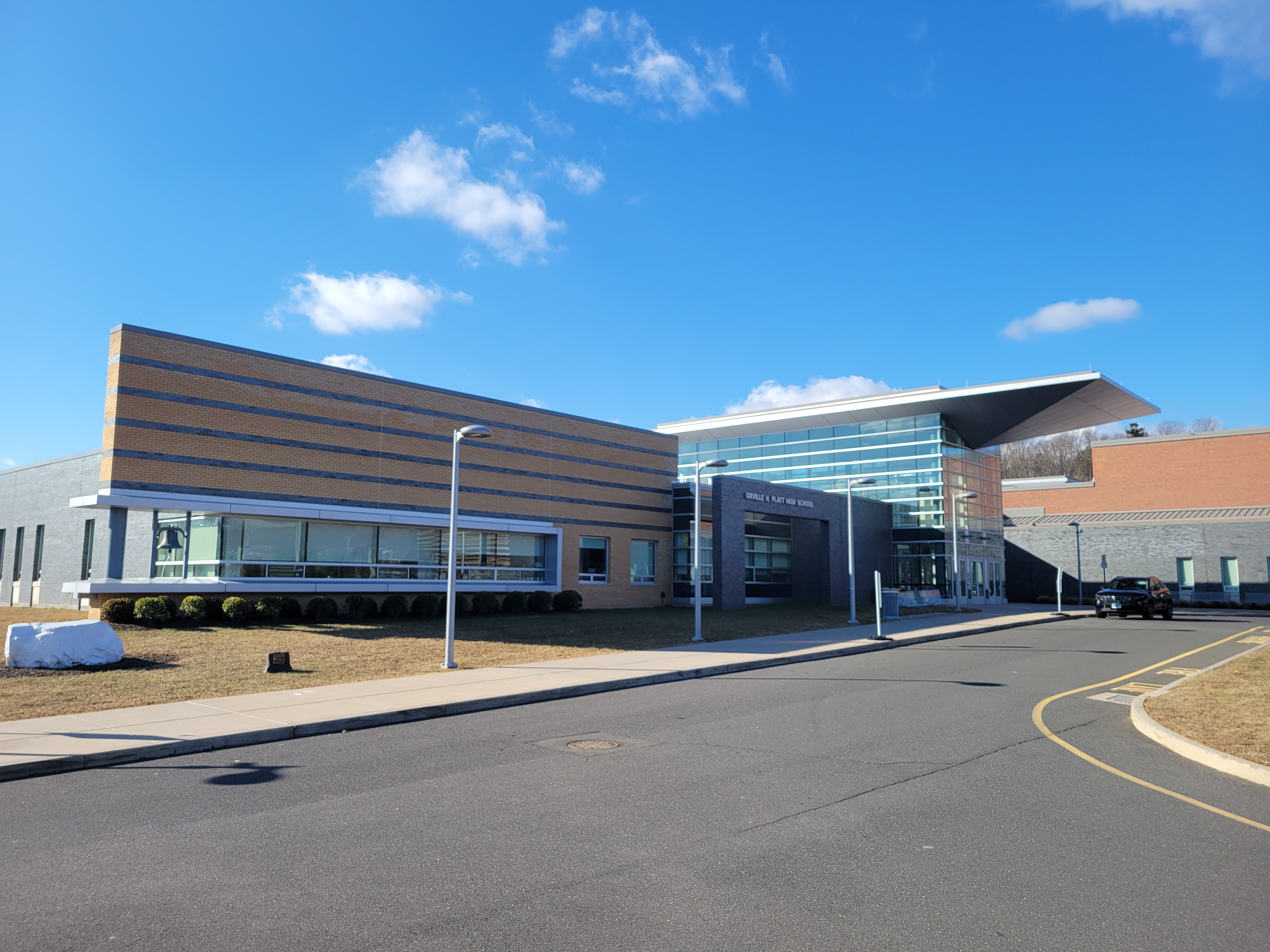

Location
- 220 Coe Avenue; Meriden, Connecticut 06451; United States; 41°32′02″N 72°49′36″W

Information
- Type: Public school
- School district: Meriden Public Schools
- Superintendent: Mark D. Benigni
- CEEB code: 070388
- Principal: Daniel Corsetti
- Teaching staff: 74.05 (FTE)
- Grades: 9-12
- Enrollment: 1,184 (2023–2024)
- Student to teacher ratio: 15.99
- Colors: Blue and Vegas Gold
- Team name: Panthers
- Rivals: Francis T. Maloney High School
- Website: www.platths.com

Orville H. Platt High School, commonly called Platt High School, is a public high school located in Meriden, Connecticut.

== History ==
In the late 1950s, Meriden High School suffered from overcrowding. Two high schools were built in Meriden to relieve the overcrowding: Orville H. Platt High School, named after Orville H. Platt, and Francis T. Maloney High School. Platt first opened in September, 1958. The school was expanded in September 1970; additions included more classrooms, a graphics art department, library space, cafeteria space, a second gymnasium, and a swimming pool. Starting in October 2013, the school underwent massive renovation, finishing fall 2017. These renovations included the addition of a new wing containing, among other things, a freshman academy and a vocational technology facility.

== Athletics ==
Platt High School is part of the Central Connecticut Conference (CCC) which features member schools in the Greater Hartford region of Connecticut, United States.

=== Basketball ===
==== Girls ====
The 1989 girls basketball team won the Class L state crown with a 23-2 record and won the state title game in overtime against Notre Dame - Fairfield. The final score was 61-53, the end of an unforgettable season. The team only gave up 38 points per game. Tom Johnson coached the team made up of Kim Penwell, Kelly Penwell, Michelle Demers, Chrissy Danko, Christine Wanat, Michelle Cooley, Latashia Williams, Heidi Schmidt, Kelly Grady and Sarah Lane. Johnson and Cooley were inducted into the Platt High School Hall of Fame in 2014.

In 2000 Kelly Penwell was inducted into the Connecticut Women's Basketball Hall of Fame.

In 2011 Tina Gonyea took over as head coach having spent 13 years as an assistant coach. Gonyea was the first 1,000-point scorer in Platt girls basketball history. She played for Johnson and graduated from Platt in 1986. She played three sports while at Platt, soccer, basketball and softball, and earned All-State honors in all three. She was the first Platt athlete to earn that distinction. Gonyea went on to Keene State and played basketball, eclipsing 1,000 points and helping the Division II program win ECAC championships in 1988 and 1989. By the time she graduated in 1990, Gonyea was Keene State's all-time career leader in assists and steals. Gonyea is a member of multiple Halls of Fame: Platt, Keene State, the Connecticut Women's Basketball Hall of Fame, the New Haven Tap Off Club Hall of Fame and the New England Basketball Hall of Fame. Coach Gonyea resigned in 2023

==== Boys ====
Anthony Nimani holds the record for most career points scored. Nimani is a two-time All-Stater and the two-time Record-Journal Boys Basketball Player of the Year. He finished with 1,626 points in his career, which included the COVID-shortened season of 2020-21, which sapped the potential for more points. In the 2022-2023 season Nimani averaged just under 25 points, in which the Panthers went 20-6. He guided the Panthers to their first ever CCC Tournament and state semifinal appearances.

=== Track and Field, Indoor Track and Cross Country ===
On May 10, 2023 Platt dedicated the track facility for Don Friedman, Roy Gooding and John Klarman. The three men are iconic figures from the school's track and field and cross country history. Platt Athletic Director Rich Katz termed them “the founding fathers” of Platt outdoor track, indoor track and cross country. Klarman, who taught in geometry Meriden for 33 years, was the original track coach at Platt when the school opened in the fall of 1958. A year later, he hired Gooding as his assistant. At the time, the team competed on a dirt track. Klarman would line it before meets. He and Gooding also constructed the jumping pits. Gooding started Platt cross country in 1960. Friedman graduated Platt in 1968 and ran for Gooding as a student and later coached with him. In 1980, Friedman successfully lobbied the school administration and the Board of Education to establish both a girls cross country and girls track program, with Klarman coaching the initial teams. Friedman also started the indoor track club and, in the 1988-89 school year, it was added as a varsity sport at Platt. Friedman was the first coach. It was a long road for Friedman, who for eight years made requests and presentations to the Board of Education until indoor track was granted varsity status. All of it started with Klarman. He graduated from CCSU in 1952 and taught at Lincoln before moving on to Platt when it opened in 1958. He remained there until retiring in 1985. Klarman's boys track teams won five straight Central Connecticut Interscholastic League titles starting in 1969. (1969, 1970, 1971, 1972, 1973). He also won three CCIL crowns in girls cross country and two in girls track. Gooding, after being brought aboard as Klarman's track assistant in 1959, started the Platt cross country program in 1960. His 1967 cross country team was undefeated and won Platt's first CIAC Class B state championship. Friedman started his career in 1973 as a math and social studies teacher at Platt, coaching cross country and track all the while, either as a head coach or an assistant. While he was head man from 1975 to 1987, Platt boys cross country teams compiled a record of 100-31 and won league titles in 1977 and 1978. His girls cross country teams won league titles both seasons he coached, 1985 and 1986. Numerous runners attained All-Conference and All-State status during Friedman's tenure. In 1986, he was named the Connecticut High School Coaches Association's outstanding coach of boys cross country.

=== Wrestling ===
Platt's wrestling program has many distinguished honors. In addition to producing numerous state champions the program has produced Academic All-Americans: John DiBacco (1994), Mike Cerrone (1996), Luis Murillo Jr. (2002), Ralph Riello (2007), Kristion Neysmith (2012), Ben Stratton (2018), and Mathew Merrigan (2022) and two All-American wrestlers on the mat in Jason Carino (1991) and West Johnson (2007).

2002 graduate Louis Murillo Jr. won the Class M state wrestling title three times. As a senior, he won the State Open crown. He went on to finish third in New England and 5-2 in a national tournament that year. Murillo Jr. finished his career with a 153-18 mark and went to college at Trinity and, after that, the military.

In 2017 Nick Martone was crowned the Class M heavyweight wrestling champion.

In 2018 Ben Stratton won the State Open championship at 182 pounds. He was named as an Academic All-American by the National High School Coaches Academy. He is a three-time place finisher at the state championship bouts. He took third as a sophomore, second as a junior and won the Class M title at 182 pounds, as a senior. Stratton's crowning achievement was becoming Platt's third-ever State Open champion. His final match of his high school career was when he took fourth at New England's. As a senior, he was 43-2 and totaled a 129-30 career mark. Stratton is the sixth Academic All-American Platt wrestling has produced.

In 2022 Coach Bryan McCarty was inducted into the Connecticut Chapter of the National Wrestling Hall of Fame. McCarty was hired to be the head coach at Platt in 1991-92 at the age of 18 after spending one season as an assistant coach. McCarty, who was awarded the Coach of the Year award in 2012 from the Connecticut High School Coaches Association, has led the Panthers to 511 dual meet wins, which is No. 5 on state's career win list in wrestling. A Special Education teacher in the Meriden school system, Bryan was named Platt High Teacher of the Year in 2017.

=== Soccer ===
The boys soccer program won three consecutive league championships in 1974, 1975, and 1976. Under Coach John Cristini the 74 team captained by Kieren Moore and Thomas Macri finished the regular season with 12 wins and 4 losses. The 1975 team won the Colonial Conference title outright and finished with an unbeaten and untied regular season. In addition to winning the conference title, the Panthers were also honored by the Connecticut Soccer Association by naming two players, Eugenio Parisi and Ernesto Ferrero, to the All State Soccer Team. Parisi, a third time member of All State, was also named to the All New England team as well. Eugenio collected 48 goals and 40 assists in his three year career at Platt, while Ernesto scored 13 goals and 9 assists during the 75 season. The 1976 team won the Colonial Conference for a third year in a row with a record of 12 wins, 2 losses and 2 ties.

=== Football ===
Platt football has a strong history. The Panthers have won league championships in 1967, 1971, 1986, 1996, 1997, 2004, 2012, 2013, 2016, and 2018. They have made the state playoffs in 1986, 1997, 2004, 2010, 2012, 2013, 2016, and 2018. They have been state finalists in 1986 and 1997.

==== Stoddard Bowl ====
With the creation of two new schools in 1958 to replace Meriden High School an instant rivalry was created. The Maloney Spartans and the Platt Panther face each other on Thanksgiving each year for the Stoddard Bowl. The game gains media attention all over the city and has upwards of 2000 people attending the game.

=== Baseball ===
On May 22, 2023 it was announced that Platt's home baseball game against Maloney each year will be the “Rich Katz Baseball Classic.” Rich Katz graduated from Platt in 1970. In 1969, he hit .463 with 34 hits, including five triples with five home runs, and 32 RBI. The five triples was Platt's single-season record until E.J. Dudley broke it in 2018. Katz was an All-American third baseman in high school and later player right field in college. Katz coached Platt baseball from 1976 to 2000. He oversaw league championships in 1985, 86, 91 and 92. The Panthers were the state runners-up in 1984 and won it all in 1986. That ‘86 team holds the program record for wins in a season with 22. Katz was drafted by the Cleveland Indians in 1970 as a high school senior, but didn't sign. Instead, he went to Jacksonville University and hit .375 in his college career. As an All-American senior at JU in 1973, Katz hit .396 and was the national RBI champion for all levels of college baseball with 67. He led the Dolphins in every major offensive category as a senior and was offered a free agent contract from the Kansas City Royals in 1973 before being drafted by the Baltimore Orioles in the 1974 MLB draft. Katz received the National Interscholastic Athletic Administrators Association Outstanding Service Award in 2012, 2017 and 2022. He was a Meriden Sportsman Of Distinction in 2011 and co-founded the Platt High School Athletic Hall of Fame in 1997. Katz was inducted into the Jacksonville University Hall of Fame in 1995. The baseball field at Platt High School was dedicated to Katz on June 1, 2023

== Notable alumni ==
This article's list of alumni may not follow Wikipedia's verifiability policy. Please improve this article by removing names that do not have independent reliable sources showing they merit inclusion in this article AND are alumni, or by incorporating the relevant publications into the body of the article through appropriate citations. (July 2022)

- Gary S. Burr, American musician, songwriter, and record producer, primarily in the country music genre
- Keia Clarke, Chief Executive Officer of the New York Liberty
