= Ronald Gilson =

American lawyer

Ronald J. Gilson (born 1946) is an American lawyer, focusing in corporate governance, law & economics, corporate finance, capital markets, mergers & acquisitions and securities regulation, currently the Charles J. Meyers Professor of Law and Business, Emeritus at Stanford Law School.
