= Declan Doyle =

American football coach (born 1996)

Baltimore Ravens
- Title: Offensive coordinator

Personal information
- Born: March 6, 1996 (age 30); Iowa City, Iowa, U.S.

Career information
- College: Iowa Western (2014–2015); Iowa (2016–2018)

Career history
- Iowa (2016–2018) Student assistant; New Orleans Saints (2019–2022) Offensive assistant; Denver Broncos (2023–2024) Tight ends coach; Chicago Bears (2025) Offensive coordinator; Baltimore Ravens (2026–present) Offensive coordinator
- Coaching profile at Pro Football Reference

Declan Doyle (born March 6, 1996) is an American professional football coach who is the offensive coordinator for the Baltimore Ravens of the National Football League (NFL). He previously served as the offensive coordinator for the Chicago Bears in 2025.

Doyle's NFL coaching career began as an assistant with the New Orleans Saints in 2019 as an offensive assistant. He then joined the Denver Broncos as their tight ends coach before being hired by the Chicago Bears as their offensive coordinator in 2025. On January 30, 2026, he left the Bears after one year to take the same position with the Ravens.

== Coaching career ==
=== Iowa ===
In 2016, as a sophomore in college, Doyle transferred to the University of Iowa and became a student offensive assistant for the Iowa Hawkeyes football program. He had previously spent his freshman year at Iowa Western Community College, where he was a captain on the baseball team.

=== New Orleans Saints ===
In 2019, Doyle was hired by the New Orleans Saints as an offensive assistant under head coach Sean Payton. After Payton retired following the 2021 season, he remained with the Saints under new head coach Dennis Allen.

=== Denver Broncos ===
On February 25, 2023, Doyle was hired by the Denver Broncos as their tight ends coach to reunite with Sean Payton, who came out of retirement to become the new head coach of the Broncos.

=== Chicago Bears ===
On January 28, 2025, Doyle was hired by the Chicago Bears as their offensive coordinator under new head coach Ben Johnson. At the age of 28, he was the youngest offensive coordinator in the league.

With Johnson being the play caller, Doyle's main responsibility as offensive coordinator was to help him develop a game plan and study film. Johnson described hiring Doyle as him seeking somebody who would be "extremely detail oriented, organized and structured to set the table and also be willing to work late nights." Doyle was also tasked with speaking to the offense at halftime and making adjustments for the second half, which helped the Bears record seven comeback victories in 2025.

=== Baltimore Ravens ===
After one season with the Bears, Doyle chose to leave in order to join the staff of head coach Jesse Minter, and was hired as the offensive coordinator for the Baltimore Ravens on February 2, 2026.

== Personal life ==
Doyle is the son of former Iowa football strength and conditioning coach Chris Doyle.
