= Jesse Minter =

American football player and coach (born 1983)

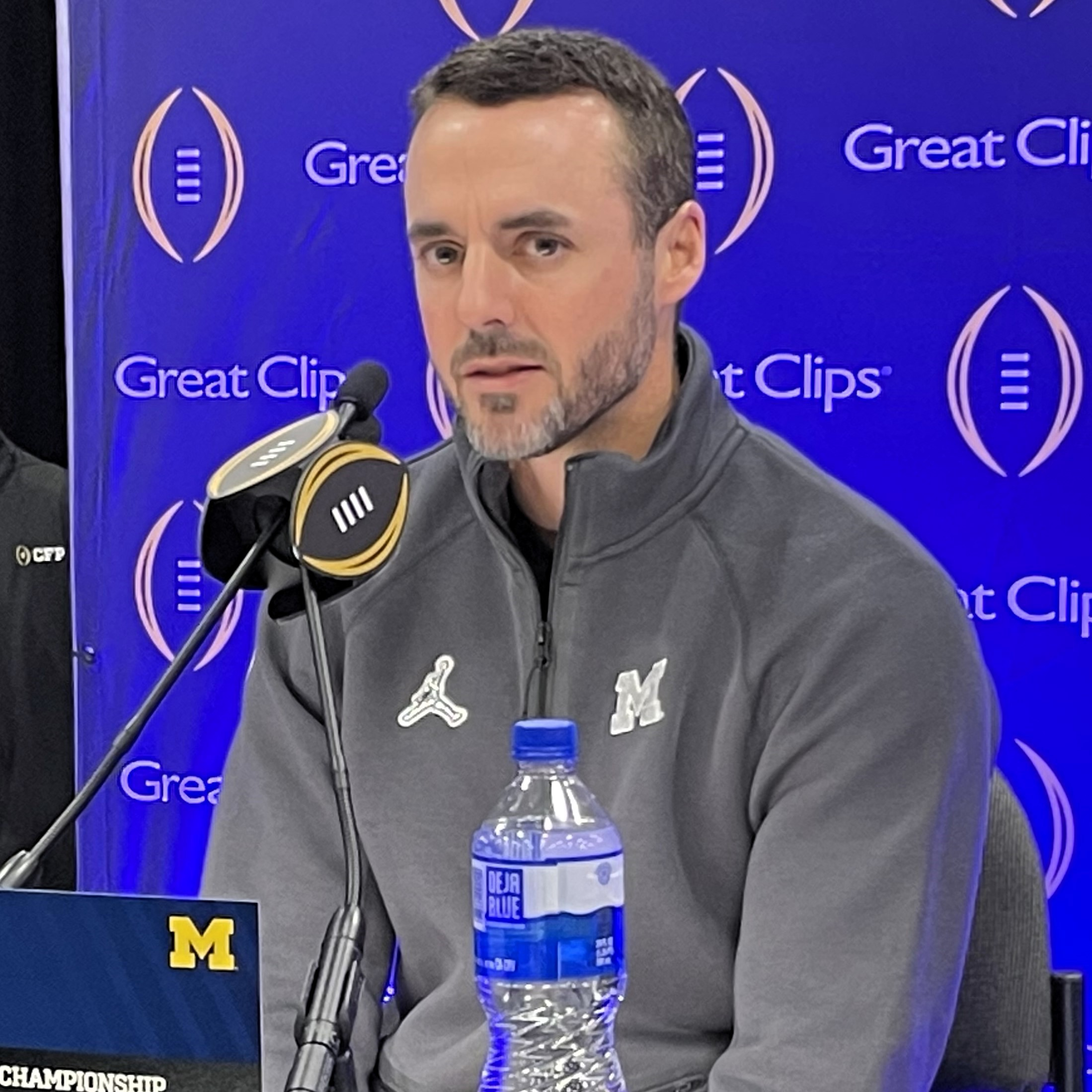
- Minter with the Michigan Wolverines in 2023

Baltimore Ravens
- Title: Head coach

Personal information
- Born: May 9, 1983 (age 43); Little Rock, Arkansas, U.S.

Career information
- Position: Wide receiver
- High school: Yorktown (Yorktown, Indiana)
- College: Mount St. Joseph (2002–2005)

Career history
- Notre Dame (2006) Defensive intern; Cincinnati (2007–2008) Graduate assistant; Indiana State (2009–2012); Linebackers coach (2009–2010); Defensive coordinator (2011–2012); Georgia State (2013–2016) Defensive coordinator; Baltimore Ravens (2017–2020); Defensive assistant (2017–2018); Assistant defensive backs coach (2019); Defensive backs coach (2020); Vanderbilt (2021) Defensive coordinator & safeties coach; Michigan (2022–2023) Defensive coordinator; Los Angeles Chargers (2024–2025) Defensive coordinator; Baltimore Ravens (2026–present) Head coach

Awards and highlights
- CFP national champion (2023)

Head coaching record
- Regular season: 4–5 (.444)
- Career: NFL: 4–5 (.444); NCAA: 1–0 (1.000)
- Coaching profile at Pro Football Reference

Jesse Cole Minter (born May 9, 1983) is an American professional football coach who is the head coach for the Baltimore Ravens of the National Football League (NFL). He was previously the defensive coordinator for the Los Angeles Chargers from 2024 to 2025 and the University of Michigan from 2022 to 2023.

Minter played college football at Mount St. Joseph University. He previously served as an assistant coach at the University of Michigan, Vanderbilt University, Georgia State University, Indiana State University, University of Cincinnati, and the University of Notre Dame.

== Early life and playing career ==
Minter was born on May 9, 1983, in Little Rock, Arkansas. Growing up, he moved several times due to his father Rick Minter's career as a college coach, graduating from Yorktown High School in Yorktown, Indiana.

Minter was a four-year wide receiver at Mount St. Joseph University from 2002 to 2005.

== Coaching career ==
=== Notre Dame ===
Minter began his coaching career at Notre Dame as a defensive intern for one season before going on to Cincinnati as a graduate assistant.

=== Cincinnati ===
Minter left Cincinnati after two seasons to become the linebackers coach at Indiana State in 2009, working his way up to defensive coordinator.

=== Georgia State ===
Minter joined Georgia State in 2012 as their defensive coordinator. During his time with Georgia State, Minter helped develop the Panthers defense to where they were eighth in the Football Bowl Subdivision (FBS) pass defense in his final season with the team, while also earning a Broyles Award nomination.

=== Baltimore Ravens ===
In 2017, Minter departed Georgia State to join the Baltimore Ravens as a defensive assistant, where he worked with the defensive backs. Minter was promoted to defensive backs coach three years later.

=== Vanderbilt ===
In 2021, Minter was hired at Vanderbilt to be their defensive coordinator and safeties coach.

=== Michigan ===
Minter was announced to be joining the University of Michigan coaching staff as the defensive coordinator on February 9, 2022. He replaced former Ravens colleague Mike Macdonald.

In the wake of Jim Harbaugh's three-game suspension to open the 2023 season, it was announced that Minter would serve as interim head coach for Michigan's first game of the season against East Carolina. On September 2, 2023, Minter led the Wolverines to a 30–3 victory over the East Carolina Pirates, giving him his first official win as a head coach.

=== Los Angeles Chargers ===
On February 6, 2024, Minter was hired by the Los Angeles Chargers as their defensive coordinator under head coach Jim Harbaugh, whom he coached under at Michigan.

=== Baltimore Ravens (second stint) ===
On January 22, 2026, Minter was announced as the fourth head coach in the history of the Baltimore Ravens, replacing John Harbaugh.

== Head coaching record ==
=== College ===
Year	Team	Overall	Conference	Standing	Bowl/playoffs	Coaches^{#}	AP^{°}
Michigan Wolverines (Big Ten Conference) (2023)
2023	Michigan	1–0 (Note: Michigan's head coach, Jim Harbaugh, was suspended for the first three games of the 2023 season. Minter served as interim head coach for the first game of the season, Jay Harbaugh and Mike Hart were interim co-head coaches for the second game, and Sherrone Moore served as interim head coach for the third game.)	0–0	(East)			
Michigan:		1–0	0–0				
Total:		1–0					

=== NFL ===
Team	Year	Regular season					Postseason			
Team	Year	Won	Lost	Ties	Win %	Finish	Won	Lost	Win %	Result
BAL	2026	4	5	0	.444	TBD in AFC North	—	—	—	—
Total		4	5	0	.444		–	–	–	

== Personal life ==
Minter's father, Rick, was the head football coach at the University of Cincinnati and is currently a senior defensive analyst for the Baltimore Ravens. Since the start of Jesse's coaching career, the two have coached eight seasons together on six different collegiate and professional teams.

Minter and his wife Rachelle have three children.
