= 2023 Baltimore Ravens season =

28th season in franchise history

- Owner: Steve Bisciotti
- General manager: Eric DeCosta
- Head coach: John Harbaugh
- Offensive coordinator: Todd Monken
- Defensive coordinator: Mike Macdonald
- Home stadium: M&T Bank Stadium

Results
- Record: 13–4
- Division place: 1st AFC North
- Playoffs: Won Divisional Playoffs (vs. Texans) 34–10; Lost AFC Championship (vs. Chiefs) 10–17
- All-Pros: 6: QB Lamar Jackson (1st team); ILB Roquan Smith (1st team); S Kyle Hamilton (1st team); FB Patrick Ricard (2nd team); DT Justin Madubuike (2nd team); ILB Patrick Queen (2nd team)
- Pro Bowlers: 8: QB Lamar Jackson; G Kevin Zeitler; C Tyler Linderbaum; DT Justin Madubuike; ILB Patrick Queen; ILB Roquan Smith; S Kyle Hamilton; K Justin Tucker

Uniform
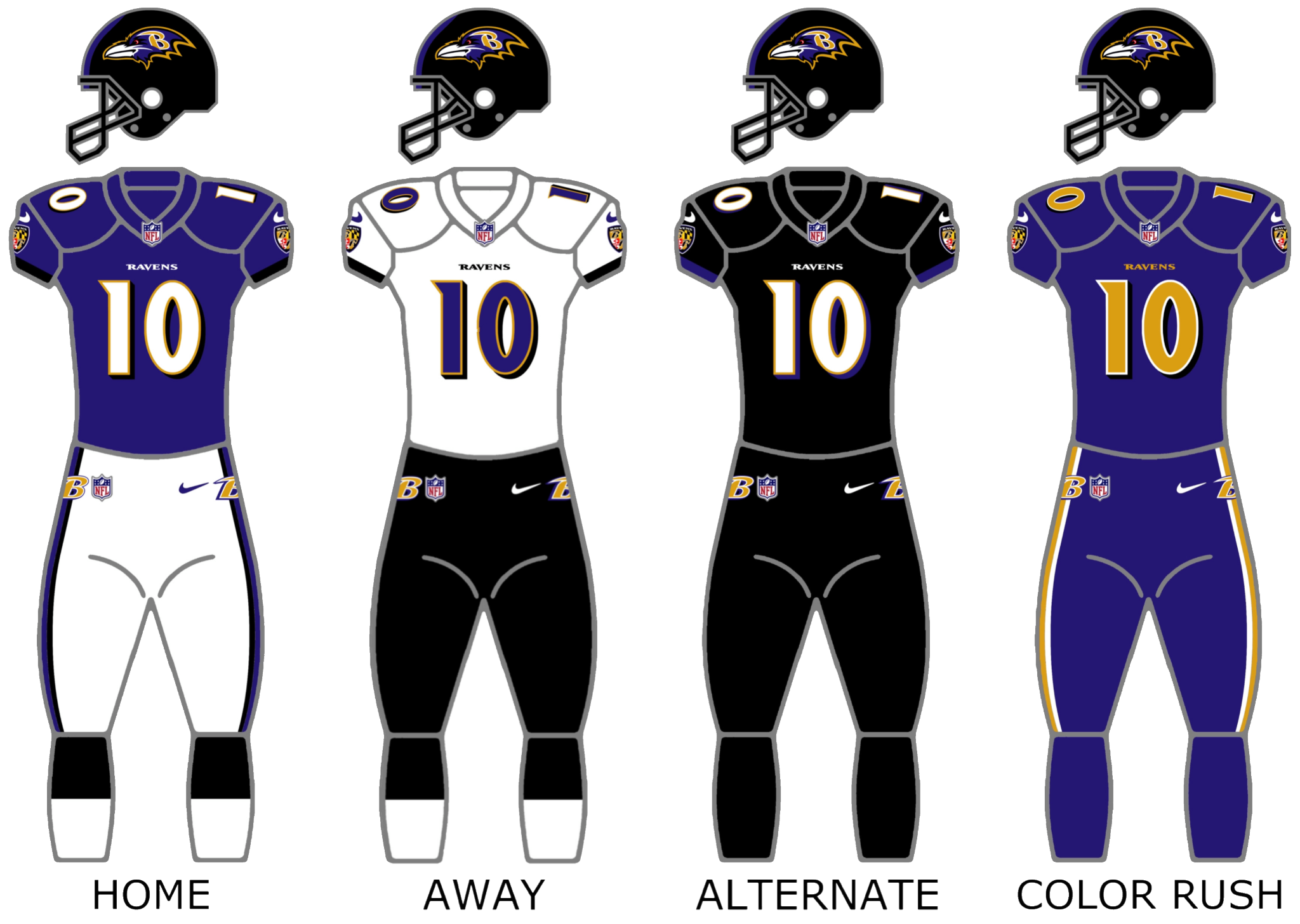

The 2023 season was the Baltimore Ravens' 28th in the National Football League (NFL) and their 16th under head coach John Harbaugh. Baltimore made their second consecutive postseason appearance, having improved on their 10–7 record from the previous season.

The Ravens' NFL-record preseason winning streak was snapped at 24 games when they lost to the Washington Commanders in the second week of the preseason.

Both Nick Moore and Trayvon Mullen suffered season-ending injuries before the season started and Marlon Humphrey missed the beginning of the season due to a foot injury that required surgery. J. K. Dobbins also suffered a season-ending Achilles injury in Week 1. By Week 4, 20 players had suffered injuries, including all three of the Ravens' primary running backs, and they would also lose Mark Andrews and Keaton Mitchell to injuries as well, although the former returned for the playoffs. Despite these injuries, the Ravens had their best season since 2019, when they went 14–2. They clinched the first AFC playoff berth in Week 15 after beating the Jacksonville Jaguars. They won the AFC North and clinched the No. 1 seed for the second time in franchise history (after 2019) with a blowout Week 17 victory over the Miami Dolphins. The Ravens finished the season with a 13–4 record, including 10 wins over teams that finished with winning records (an NFL record), five of which came against teams that entered the game as division leaders who were three games or more over .500. They also held a lead in all but one game during the season, which was the season-finale loss to the Pittsburgh Steelers in which most of their starters were resting and did not play.

The Ravens defense also led the league in sacks, points per game, and takeaways, becoming the first team in NFL history to lead in all three categories. Quarterback Lamar Jackson won the season's NFL MVP award, his second.

The Ravens defeated the Houston Texans 34–10 in the Divisional Round of the playoffs to advance to their first AFC Championship Game since their Super Bowl winning-2012 season, but were upset by the defending and eventual Super Bowl champion Kansas City Chiefs 17–10 in that game. This was the first time in franchise history that the Ravens hosted the AFC Championship Game, the first time the city of Baltimore has hosted the game since January 1971, and the first time in franchise history the Ravens hosted more than one home playoff game in a single postseason.

The Baltimore Ravens drew an average home attendance of 70,597 in 9 home games in the 2023 NFL season, the 11th highest in the league.

== Offseason ==
=== Free agents ===
Position	Player	Tag	2023 team	Date signed	Contract
OLB	Vince Biegel	UFA			
C	Trystan Colon	UFA	New York Jets	March 22, 2023	1 year, $1.66 million
CB	Kyle Fuller	UFA			
RB	Kenyan Drake	UFA	Indinanapolis Colts	August 5, 2023	1 year, $1.32 million
RB	Justice Hill	UFA	Baltimore Ravens	March 17, 2023	2 years, $4.51 million
QB	Tyler Huntley	RFA	Baltimore Ravens	April 24, 2023	1 year, $2.63 million
OLB	Justin Houston	UFA	Carolina Panthers	August 6, 2023	1 year, $6 million
QB	Lamar Jackson	UFA	Baltimore Ravens	April 28, 2023	5 years, $260 million
OT	Ja'Wuan James	UFA			
OLB	Steven Means	UFA			
LS	Nick Moore	UFA	Baltimore Ravens	March 16, 2023	2 years, $2.95 million
CB	Trayvon Mullen	UFA	Baltimore Ravens	March 14, 2023	1 year, $1.08 million
TE	Josh Oliver	UFA	Minnesota Vikings	March 15, 2023	3 years, $21 million
LB	Del'Shawn Phillips	UFA	Baltimore Ravens	March 19, 2023	1 year, $1.11 million
CB	Marcus Peters	UFA	Las Vegas Raiders	July 24, 2023	1 year, $3 million
OLB	Jason Pierre-Paul	UFA	New Orleans Saints	November 16, 2023	1 year, $370,000
OG	Ben Powers	UFA	Denver Broncos	March 16, 2023	4 years, $51.5 million
WR	Demarcus Robinson	UFA	Los Angeles Rams	June 12, 2023	1 year, $1.17 million
CB	Kevon Seymour	UFA	Baltimore Ravens	April 24, 2023	1 year, $1.08 million
S	Geno Stone	RFA	Baltimore Ravens	March 17, 2023	1 year, $1.76 million
DE	Brent Urban	UFA	Baltimore Ravens	February 15, 2023	1 year, $1.17 million
WR	Sammy Watkins	UFA			
LB	Kristian Welch	UFA	Baltimore Ravens	April 6, 2023	1 year, $1.01 million
CB	Daryl Worley	UFA	Baltimore Ravens	February 15, 2023	1 year, $1.17 million

=== Signings ===
Position	Player	Previous team	Date signed	Contract
WR	Nelson Agholor	New England Patriots	March 24, 2023	1 year, $3.25 million
WR	Odell Beckham Jr.	None (Note: Beckham's most recent team was the Los Angeles Rams, for whom he played for in 2021.)	April 9, 2023	1 year, $15 million
CB	Rock Ya-Sin	Las Vegas Raiders	May 3, 2023	1 year, $4 million
C	Sam Mustipher	Chicago Bears	May 15, 2023	1 year, $1.01 million
QB	Josh Johnson	San Francisco 49ers	May 22, 2023	1 year, $1.32 million
DE	Angelo Blackson	Chicago Bears	May 24, 2023	1 year, $1.17 million
WR	Laquon Treadwell	Seattle Seahawks	June 5, 2023	1 year, $1.7 million
RB	Melvin Gordon	Kansas City Chiefs	July 21, 2023	1 year, $1.7 million
CB	Arthur Maulet	Pittsburgh Steelers	July 25, 2023	1 year, $1.08 million
LS	Tyler Ott	Seattle Seahawks	July 25, 2023	1 year, $1.08 million
CB	Ronald Darby	Denver Broncos	August 17, 2023	1 year, $1.7 million
OLB	Jadeveon Clowney	Cleveland Browns	August 18, 2023	1 year, $2.5 million

=== Players lost ===
Position	Player	Reason	2023 team	Date	Contract
S	Chuck Clark	Traded	New York Jets	March 9, 2023	N/A
DE	Calais Campbell	Released	Atlanta Falcons	March 29, 2023	1 year, $7 million
OLB	Daelin Hayes	Released	San Francisco 49ers	May 22, 2023	1 year, $870,000

Offseason notes

== Draft ==
2023 Baltimore Ravens draft selections
Round	Selection	Player	Position	College	Notes
1	22	Zay Flowers	WR	Boston College	
2	53	Traded to the Chicago Bears (Note: The Ravens traded second- and fifth-round selections (53rd and 148th overall), and LB A. J. Klein to the Chicago Bears in exchange for LB Roquan Smith.)			
3	86	Trenton Simpson	LB	Clemson	
4	124	Tavius Robinson	DE	Ole Miss	
5	148	Traded to the Chicago Bears			From Patriots (Note: The Ravens traded CB Shaun Wade to the New England Patriots in exchange for a fifth-round selection (148th overall) and a 2022 seventh-round selection.)
5	157	Kyu Blu Kelly	CB	Stanford	
6	199	Malaesala Aumavae–Laulu	OT	Oregon	
7	229	Andrew Vorhees	G	USC	From Browns (Note: The Ravens traded a 2024 sixth-round selection to the Cleveland Browns in exchange for a seventh-round selection (229th overall).)
7	240	Traded to the New York Giants (Note: The Ravens traded a seventh-round selection (240th overall), a 2022 fifth-round selection and G Ben Bredeson to the New York Giants in exchange for a 2022 fourth-round selection.)			

Draft trades

2023 Baltimore Ravens undrafted free agents
Name	Position	College	Ref.
Levi Bell	FB/DT	Texas State	
Trey Botts	DT	CSU Pueblo	
Kaieem Caesar	DT	Ohio	
Dontay Demus Jr.	WR	Maryland	
Tykeem Doss	OT	Southern Miss	
Jake Guidone	C	UConn	
Nolan Henderson	QB	Delaware	
Malik Hamm	OLB	Lafayette	
Brandon Kipper	G	Oregon State	
Jeremy Lucien	CB	Vanderbilt	
Tashawn Manning	G	Kentucky	
Corey Mayfield Jr.	CB	UTSA	
Keaton Mitchell	RB	East Carolina	
Sean Ryan	WR	Rutgers	
Kelle Sanders	OLB	UAB	
Travis Vokolek	TE	Nebraska	
Brian Walker	TE	Shepherd	
Owen Wright	RB	Monmouth	
Jaquan Amos	S	Ball State	
Jaylon Thomas	OT	SMU	
Jordan Swann	CB	James Madison	

Key
Made roster
Made practice squad

== Staff ==
=== Coaching changes ===
2023 Baltimore Ravens Staff Changes
Coach	Position	Reason left	Replacement
Greg Roman	Offensive coordinator	Contract not renewed	Todd Monken
Ryan Osborn	Defensive assistant	Accepted job at Charlotte	N/A
Craig Ver Steeg	Running backs coach	Title change	Willie Taggart
James Urban	Quarterbacks coach	Title change	Tee Martin
Tee Martin	Wide receivers coach	Title change	Greg Lewis
Steve Saunders	Head strength and conditioning	Fired	Scott Elliott
D'Anton Lynn	Safeties coach	Accepted job at UCLA	Dennard Wilson
Rob Leonard	Outside linebackers coach	Accepted job with Las Vegas Raiders	Chuck Smith

2023 Baltimore Ravens staff
Front office: Owner – Steve Bisciotti; President – Sashi Brown; Executive vice president/general manager – Eric DeCosta; Executive vice president – Ozzie Newsome; Senior vice president of football operations – Pat Moriarty; Director of player personnel – Joe Hortiz; Director of player personnel – George Kokinis; Assistant director of player personnel – Mark Azevedo; Director of college scouting – David Blackburn; Senior player personnel executive – Vince Newsome; Vice president of football administration – Nick Matteo; Director of compliance – Jessica Markison; Head coaches: Head coach – John Harbaugh; Associate head coach/defensive line – Anthony Weaver; Offensive coaches: Offensive coordinator – Todd Monken; Quarterbacks – Tee Martin; Assistant quarterbacks – Kerry Dixon; Running backs – Willie Taggart; Wide receivers – Greg Lewis; Assistant wide receivers – Keith Williams; Tight ends – George Godsey; Offensive line – Joe D'Alessandris; Assistant offensive line – Mike Devlin; Offensive quality control – Danny Breyer; Offensive quality control – Travis Switzer	Defensive coaches: Defensive coordinator – Mike Macdonald; Outside linebackers – Chuck Smith; Inside linebackers – Zachary Orr; Pass game coordinator/secondary – Chris Hewitt; Defensive backs – Dennard Wilson; Defensive quality control – Matt Robinson; Defensive quality control – Daniel Stern; Special teams coaches: Special teams coordinator – Chris Horton; Special teams/specialist – Randy Brown; Special teams – T. J. Weist; Strength and conditioning: Football performance coordinator – Sam Rosengarten; Head strength and conditioning – Scott Elliott; Assistant strength and conditioning – Kaelyn Buskey; Strength and conditioning – Ron Shrift; Strength and conditioning – Anthony Watson

== Final roster ==
2023 Baltimore Ravens roster
Quarterbacks (QB): 12 Malik Cunningham; 2 Tyler Huntley; 8 Lamar Jackson; 17 Josh Johnson; Running backs (RB): 31 Dalvin Cook; 35 Gus Edwards; 43 Justice Hill; 42 Patrick Ricard; Wide receivers (WR): 15 Nelson Agholor; 7 Rashod Bateman; 3 Odell Beckham Jr.; 13 Devin Duvernay; 4 Zay Flowers; 16 Tylan Wallace; Tight ends (TE): 89 Mark Andrews; 88 Charlie Kolar; 80 Isaiah Likely	Offensive linemen (OL): 71 Malaesala Aumavae–Laulu G; 66 Ben Cleveland G; 77 Daniel Faalele T; 64 Tyler Linderbaum C; 65 Patrick Mekari T; 78 Morgan Moses T; 61 Sam Mustipher C; 76 John Simpson G; 79 Ronnie Stanley T; 70 Kevin Zeitler G; Defensive linemen (DL): 98 Travis Jones NT; 92 Justin Madubuike DE; 58 Michael Pierce NT; 97 Brent Urban DE; 96 Broderick Washington DE	Linebackers (LB): 24 Jadeveon Clowney OLB; 40 Malik Harrison OLB; 99 Odafe Oweh OLB; 53 Del'Shawn Phillips ILB; 6 Patrick Queen ILB; 95 Tavius Robinson OLB; 30 Trenton Simpson ILB; 0 Roquan Smith ILB; 50 Kyle Van Noy OLB; Defensive backs (DB): 28 Ronald Darby CB; 14 Kyle Hamilton SS; 44 Marlon Humphrey CB; 10 Arthur Maulet CB; 23 Rock Ya-Sin CB; 21 Brandon Stephens CB; 26 Geno Stone FS/SS; 29 Ar'Darius Washington FS; 32 Marcus Williams FS; Special teams (ST): 69 Tyler Ott LS; 11 Jordan Stout P; 9 Justin Tucker K	Practice squad: 37 Andrew Adams SS; 83 Dan Chisena WR; 63 Tykeem Doss G; 33 Melvin Gordon RB; 62 Tashawn Manning G; 38 Ben Mason FB; 45 Christian Matthew CB; 91 Rayshad Nichols DE; 51 Josh Ross ILB; 93 Bravvion Roy NT; 82 Sean Ryan WR; 25 Kevon Seymour CB (PS/I); 39 Tre Swilling CB; 18 Laquon Treadwell WR; 85 Scotty Washington TE; 74 Josh Wells T; 36 Owen Wright RB; Reserve: 5 Jalyn Armour-Davis CB (IR); 54 Tyus Bowser OLB (NF-Inj.); 27 J. K. Dobbins RB (IR); 59 Malik Hamm OLB (IR); 34 Keaton Mitchell RB (IR); 46 Nick Moore LS (NF-Inj.); -- Trayvon Mullen CB (NF-Inj.); 90 David Ojabo OLB (IR); 72 Andrew Vorhees G (NF-Inj.); 22 Damarion Williams CB (IR); 41 Daryl Worley FS (IR); Rookies in italics 53 active, 11 reserve, 16 practice squad (1 exempt)

== Preseason ==
Week	Date	Opponent	Result	Record	Venue	Recap
1	August 11	Philadelphia Eagles	W 20–19	1–0	M&T Bank Stadium	Recap
2	August 21	at Washington Commanders	L 28–29	1–1	FedEx Field	Recap
3	August 26	at Tampa Bay Buccaneers	L 20–26	1–2	Raymond James Stadium	Recap

The loss to the Commanders ended the Ravens' NFL record 24-game preseason winning streak.

== Regular season ==
=== Schedule ===
Week	Date	Opponent	Result	Record	Venue	Recap
1	September 10	Houston Texans	**W** 25–9	1–0	M&T Bank Stadium	Recap
2	September 17	at **Cincinnati Bengals**	**W** 27–24	2–0	Paycor Stadium	Recap
3	September 24	Indianapolis Colts	**L** 19–22 (OT)	2–1	M&T Bank Stadium	Recap
4	October 1	at **Cleveland Browns**	**W** 28–3	3–1	Cleveland Browns Stadium	Recap
5	October 8	at **Pittsburgh Steelers**	**L** 10–17	3–2	Acrisure Stadium	Recap
6	October 15	at Tennessee Titans	**W** 24–16	4–2	(United Kingdom) Tottenham Hotspur Stadium (London)	Recap
7	October 22	Detroit Lions	**W** 38–6	5–2	M&T Bank Stadium	Recap
8	October 29	at Arizona Cardinals	**W** 31–24	6–2	State Farm Stadium	Recap
9	November 5	Seattle Seahawks	**W** 37–3	7–2	M&T Bank Stadium	Recap
10	November 12	**Cleveland Browns**	**L** 31–33	7–3	M&T Bank Stadium	Recap
11	November 16	**Cincinnati Bengals**	**W** 34–20	8–3	M&T Bank Stadium	Recap
12	November 26	at Los Angeles Chargers	**W** 20–10	9–3	SoFi Stadium	Recap
13	Bye					
14	December 10	Los Angeles Rams	**W** 37–31 (OT)	10–3	M&T Bank Stadium	Recap
15	December 17	at Jacksonville Jaguars	**W** 23–7	11–3	EverBank Stadium	Recap
16	December 25	at San Francisco 49ers	**W** 33–19	12–3	Levi's Stadium	Recap
17	December 31	Miami Dolphins	**W** 56–19	13–3	M&T Bank Stadium	Recap
18	January 6	**Pittsburgh Steelers**	**L** 10–17	13–4	M&T Bank Stadium	Recap

Note: Intra-division opponents are in bold text.

=== Game summaries ===
==== Week 1: Baltimore Ravens 25, Houston Texans 9 ====
Week 1: Houston Texans at Baltimore Ravens – Game summary

Quarter	1	2	3	4	Total
Texans	0	6	0	3	**9**
**Ravens**	7	0	15	3	**25**

at M&T Bank Stadium, Baltimore, Maryland

- Date: September 10
- Game time: 1:00 p.m. EDT
- Game weather: Overcast, 78 °F (26 °C)
- Game attendance: 70,136
- Referee: Tra Blake
- TV announcers (CBS): Spero Dedes, Adam Archuleta and Aditi Kinkhabwala
- Recap, Game Book

Game information

**First quarter**

- BAL – J. K. Dobbins 4-yard run (Justin Tucker kick), 1:00. Ravens 7–0. **Drive: 9 plays, 58 yards, 4:28.**

**Second quarter**

- HOU – Kaʻimi Fairbairn 35-yard field goal, 3:56. Ravens 7–3. **Drive: 15 plays, 67 yards, 8:54.**
- HOU – Kaʻimi Fairbairn 38-yard field goal, 0:00. Ravens 7–6. **Drive: 11 plays, 68 yards, 1:54.**

**Third quarter**

- BAL – Justice Hill 2-yard run (Gus Edwards run), 9:55. Ravens 15–6. **Drive: 8 plays, 71 yards, 3:47.**
- BAL – Justice Hill 2-yard run (Justin Tucker kick), 5:21. Ravens 22–6. **Drive: 5 plays, 42 yards, 2:14.**

**Fourth quarter**

- HOU – Kaʻimi Fairbairn 36-yard field goal, 13:47. Ravens 22–9. **Drive: 6 plays, 14 yards, 1:39.**
- BAL – Justin Tucker 39-yard field goal, 4:10. Ravens 25–9. **Drive: 7 plays, 21 yards, 4:50.**

**Top passers**

- HOU – C. J. Stroud – 28/44, 242 yards
- BAL – Lamar Jackson – 17/22, 169 yards, INT

**Top rushers**

- HOU – Dameon Pierce – 11 rushes, 38 yards
- BAL – Lamar Jackson – 6 rushes, 38 yards

**Top receivers**

- HOU – Nico Collins – 6 receptions, 80 yards
- BAL – Zay Flowers – 9 receptions, 78 yards

Despite a somewhat shaky offense performance, the Ravens defeated the Texans in their season opener 25–9, starting 1–0 for the second straight season. This was also the first game in NFL history to end with a 25–9 final score. However, several key injuries also occurred during the game, including a season-ending Achilles injury to running back J. K. Dobbins.

==== Week 2: Baltimore Ravens 27, Cincinnati Bengals 24 ====
Week 2: Baltimore Ravens at Cincinnati Bengals – Game summary

Quarter	1	2	3	4	Total
**Ravens**	7	6	7	7	**27**
Bengals	0	10	7	7	**24**

at Paycor Stadium, Cincinnati, Ohio

- Date: September 17
- Game time: 1:00 p.m. EDT
- Game weather: Cloudy, 72 °F (22 °C)
- Game attendance: 66,015
- Referee: Shawn Hochuli
- TV announcers (CBS): Andrew Catalon, Tiki Barber, Matt Ryan and AJ Ross
- Recap, Game Book

Game information

**First quarter**

- BAL – Gus Edwards 1-yard run (Justin Tucker kick), 7:12. Ravens 7–0. **Drive: 13 plays, 75 yards, 7:48.**

**Second quarter**

- CIN – Charlie Jones 81-yard punt return (Evan McPherson kick), 13:14. Tied 7–7.
- BAL – Justin Tucker 44-yard field goal, 9:15. Ravens 10–7. **Drive: 10 plays, 49 yards, 3:59.**
- CIN – Evan McPherson 27-yard field goal, 3:01. Tied 10–10. **Drive: 12 plays, 66 yards, 6:14.**
- BAL – Justin Tucker 40-yard field goal, 0:00. Ravens 13–10. **Drive: 12 plays, 53 yards, 3:01.**

**Third quarter**

- BAL – Mark Andrews 3-yard pass from Lamar Jackson (Justin Tucker kick), 8:39. Ravens 20–10. **Drive: 4 plays, 62 yards, 2:00.**
- CIN – Tee Higgins 3-yard pass from Joe Burrow (Evan McPherson kick), 2:34. Ravens 20–17. **Drive: 13 plays, 75 yards, 6:05.**

**Fourth quarter**

- BAL – Nelson Agholor 17-yard pass from Lamar Jackson (Justin Tucker kick), 11:38. Ravens 27–17. **Drive: 12 plays, 75 yards, 5:56.**
- CIN – Tee Higgins 4-yard pass from Joe Burrow (Evan McPherson kick), 3:28. Ravens 27–24. **Drive: 16 plays, 80 yards, 4:12.**

**Top passers**

- BAL – Lamar Jackson – 24/33, 237 yards, 2 TD
- CIN – Joe Burrow – 27/41, 222 yards, 2 TD, INT

**Top rushers**

- BAL – Gus Edwards – 10 rushes, 62 yards, TD
- CIN – Joe Mixon – 13 rushes, 59 yards

**Top receivers**

- BAL – Nelson Agholor – 5 receptions, 63 yards, TD
- CIN – Tee Higgins – 8 receptions, 89 yards, 2 TD

The Ravens offense improved from their previous week's performance and recorded 415 total yards in 27–24 upset road win over the Bengals. The Ravens went into halftime with a 13–10 lead before getting a crucial interception by safety Geno Stone off of Bengals quarterback Joe Burrow after the Bengals had driven into the red zone on their first drive of the third quarter. The Ravens quickly converted the turnover into a touchdown drive and held off the Bengals the rest of the way. Quarterback Lamar Jackson had 237 passing yards and 2 touchdowns to go along with 54 rushing yards while Gus Edwards added 62 rushing yards and a touchdown. With the win, the Ravens improved to 2–0.

==== Week 3: Indianapolis Colts 22, Baltimore Ravens 19 ====
Week 3: Indianapolis Colts at Baltimore Ravens – Game summary

Quarter	1	2	3	4	OT	Total
**Colts**	0	10	3	6	3	**22**
Ravens	7	0	7	5	0	**19**

at M&T Bank Stadium, Baltimore, Maryland

- Date: September 24
- Game time: 1:00 p.m. EDT
- Game weather: Steady rain, 68 °F (20 °C)
- Game attendance: 70,038
- Referee: Clete Blakeman
- TV announcers (CBS): Beth Mowins, James Lofton, Jay Feely and Amanda Renner
- Recap, Game Book

Game information

**First quarter**

- BAL – Lamar Jackson 8-yard run (Justin Tucker kick), 6:35. Ravens 7–0. **Drive: 12 plays, 80 yards, 6:31.**

**Second quarter**

- IND – Zack Moss 17-yard pass from Gardner Minshew (Matt Gay kick), 6:07. Tied 7–7. **Drive: 9 plays, 73 yards, 4:29.**
- IND – Matt Gay 31-yard field goal, 3:26. Colts 10–7. **Drive: 7 plays, 7 yards, 2:32.**

**Third quarter**

- IND – Matt Gay 54-yard field goal, 8:33. Colts 13–7. **Drive: 6 plays, 19 yards, 2:21.**
- BAL – Lamar Jackson 10-yard run (Justin Tucker kick), 0:13. Ravens 14–13. **Drive: 10 plays, 81 yards, 5:16.**

**Fourth quarter**

- IND – Matt Gay 53-yard field goal, 11:22. Colts 16–14. **Drive: 8 plays, 40 yards, 3:51.**
- BAL – Justin Tucker 50-yard field goal, 7:33. Ravens 17–16. **Drive: 8 plays, 43 yards, 3:49.**
- BAL – Gardner Minshew sacked out of bounds in end zone for a safety, 2:03. Ravens 19–16.
- IND – Matt Gay 53-yard field goal, 0:57. Tied 19–19. **Drive: 6 plays, 28 yards, 0:44.**

**Overtime**

- IND – Matt Gay 53-yard field goal, 1:09. Colts 22–19. **Drive: 5 plays, 18 yards, 2:12.**

**Top passers**

- IND – Gardner Minshew – 27/44, 227 yards, TD
- BAL – Lamar Jackson – 22/31, 202 yards

**Top rushers**

- IND – Zack Moss – 30 rushes, 122 yards
- BAL – Lamar Jackson – 14 rushes, 101 yards, 2 TD

**Top receivers**

- IND – Michael Pittman Jr. – 9 receptions, 77 yards
- BAL – Zay Flowers – 8 receptions, 48 yards

The Ravens blew a 19–16 lead with possession of the ball in the final two minutes of the 4th quarter and lost to Gardner Minshew and the Colts, 19–22, in overtime, on a 53-yard field goal by Matt Gay, the fourth 50+ yard field goal made by Gay in the game, an NFL record. Lamar Jackson had 303 total yards and two rushing touchdowns, but also lost one of two fumbles; another fumble was lost by Kenyan Drake. Justin Tucker was short on a potentially game-winning 61-yard field goal with :01 left to go in regulation as well. With the upset loss, the Ravens fell to 2–1.

==== Week 4: Baltimore Ravens 28, Cleveland Browns 3 ====
Week 4: Baltimore Ravens at Cleveland Browns – Game summary

Quarter	1	2	3	4	Total
**Ravens**	7	14	0	7	**28**
Browns	3	0	0	0	**3**

at Cleveland Browns Stadium, Cleveland, Ohio

- Date: October 1
- Game time: 1:00 p.m. EDT
- Game weather: Sunny, 71 °F (22 °C)
- Game attendance: 67,919
- Referee: Brad Allen
- TV announcers (CBS): Ian Eagle, Charles Davis and Evan Washburn
- Recap, Game Book

Game information

**First quarter**

- BAL – Lamar Jackson 10-yard run (Justin Tucker kick), 6:38. Ravens 7–0. **Drive: 1 play, 10 yards, 0:04.**
- CLE – Dustin Hopkins 53-yard field goal, 2:21. Ravens 7–3. **Drive: 8 plays, 40 yards, 4:17.**

**Second quarter**

- BAL – Lamar Jackson 2-yard run (Justin Tucker kick), 4:18. Ravens 14–3. **Drive: 8 plays, 93 yards, 4:24.**
- BAL – Mark Andrews 7-yard pass from Lamar Jackson (Justin Tucker kick), 0:11. Ravens 21–3. **Drive: 10 plays, 74 yards, 2:34.**

**Third quarter**

- No scoring plays.

**Fourth quarter**

- BAL – Mark Andrews 18-yard pass from Lamar Jackson (Justin Tucker kick), 5:56. Ravens 28–3. **Drive: 6 plays, 38 yards, 3:40.**

**Top passers**

- BAL – Lamar Jackson – 15/19, 187 yards, 2 TD
- CLE – Dorian Thompson-Robinson – 19/36, 121 yards, 3 INT

**Top rushers**

- BAL – Gus Edwards – 15 rushes, 48 yards
- CLE – Pierre Strong Jr. – 5 rushes, 49 yards

**Top receivers**

- BAL – Mark Andrews – 5 receptions, 80 yards, 2 TD
- CLE – David Njoku – 6 receptions, 46 yards

Coming off the upset loss to the Colts, the Ravens dominated the Browns en route to a 28–3 rout. Quarterback Lamar Jackson accounted for 213 of the Ravens’ 296 yards of total offense along with all four touchdowns (two rushing and two passing to Mark Andrews). Meanwhile, the Ravens defense recorded three interceptions and four sacks of Browns' quarterback Dorian Thompson-Robinson, who was starting in the place of the injured Deshaun Watson. With the win, the Ravens improved to 3–1.

==== Week 5: Pittsburgh Steelers 17, Baltimore Ravens 10 ====
Week 5: Baltimore Ravens at Pittsburgh Steelers – Game summary

Quarter	1	2	3	4	Total
Ravens	7	3	0	0	**10**
**Steelers**	0	3	0	14	**17**

at Acrisure Stadium, Pittsburgh, Pennsylvania

- Date: October 8
- Game time: 1:00 p.m. EDT
- Game weather: Partly cloudy, 53 °F (12 °C)
- Game attendance: 67,272
- Referee: Carl Cheffers
- TV announcers (CBS): Ian Eagle, Charles Davis and Evan Washburn
- Recap, Game Book

Game information

**First quarter**

- BAL – Justice Hill 14-yard run (Justin Tucker kick), 6:15. Ravens 7–0. **Drive: 7 play, 59 yards, 2:57.**

**Second quarter**

- BAL – Justin Tucker 33-yard field goal, 12:23. Ravens 10–0. **Drive: 15 plays, 63 yards, 7:22.**
- PIT – Chris Boswell 43-yard field goal, 3:16. Ravens 10–3. **Drive: 7 plays, 59 yards, 2:57.**

**Third quarter**

- No scoring plays.

**Fourth quarter**

- PIT – Punt blocked by Miles Killebrew out of bounds in end zone for a safety, 11:12. Ravens 10–5.
- PIT – Chris Boswell 25-yard field goal, 7:10. Ravens 10–8. **Drive: 9 plays, 49 yards, 4:02.**
- PIT – George Pickens 41-yard pass from Kenny Pickett (pass failed), 1:17. Steelers 14–10. **Drive: 8 plays, 80 yards, 2:49.**
- PIT – Chris Boswell 42-yard field goal, 0:49. Steelers 17–10. **Drive: 4 plays, 6 yards, 0:13.**

**Top passers**

- BAL – Lamar Jackson – 22/38, 236 yards, INT
- PIT – Kenny Pickett – 18/32, 224 yards, TD

**Top rushers**

- BAL – Gus Edwards – 12 rushes, 48 yards
- PIT – Jaylen Warren – 9 rushes, 40 yards

**Top receivers**

- BAL – Zay Flowers – 5 receptions, 73 yards
- PIT – George Pickens – 6 receptions, 130 yards, TD

The Ravens gained 335 yards compared to the Steelers' 289 and picked up 19 first downs compared to the Steelers' 17. However, the Steelers won the game due to several Baltimore miscues. Most notably, Baltimore was plagued by nine dropped passes, including some that would have resulted in big gains and touchdowns. Furthermore, near the end of the first half, the Ravens had a 10–3 lead and possession of the ball in field goal range for star kicker Justin Tucker. On a fourth and two, Ravens head coach John Harbaugh planned to run a hard count and send Tucker out to attempt the kick and extend the lead. Instead, Baltimore center Tyler Linderbaum mistakenly snapped the ball on the hard count, causing Ravens players to be surprised and turn the ball over on downs. Finally, Lamar Jackson threw a costly interception in the red zone after Pittsburgh punt returner Gunner Olszewski lost a fumble to set the Ravens up with a goal to go situation and a chance to extend the Raven lead to two scores. The Steelers eventually took advantage of the Ravens' mistakes and took their first lead (which they would not relinquish) on a George Pickens 41-yard touchdown reception with less than two minutes remaining in the game. This also would end up being the Ravens only road loss of the season.

==== Week 6: Baltimore Ravens 24, Tennessee Titans 16 ====
NFL London games

Week 6: Baltimore Ravens at Tennessee Titans – Game summary

Quarter	1	2	3	4	Total
**Ravens**	6	12	0	6	**24**
Titans	3	0	10	3	**16**

at Tottenham Hotspur Stadium, London, England

- Date: October 15
- Game time: 2:30 p.m. BST/9:30 a.m. EDT
- Game weather: Sunny, 52 °F (11 °C)
- Game attendance: 61,011
- Referee: Bill Vinovich
- TV announcers (WBAL/NFLN): Rich Eisen, Kurt Warner and Jamie Erdahl
- Recap, Game Book

Game information

**First quarter**

- BAL – Justin Tucker 41-yard field goal, 10:26. Ravens 3–0. **Drive: 8 plays, 50 yards, 4:34.**
- TEN – Nick Folk 26-yard field goal, 5:34. Tied 3–3. **Drive: 9 plays, 67 yards, 4:52.**
- BAL – Justin Tucker 28-yard field goal, 0:04. Ravens 6–3. **Drive: 10 plays, 76 yards, 5:30.**

**Second quarter**

- BAL – Justin Tucker 23-yard field goal, 6:12. Ravens 9–3. **Drive: 6 plays, 12 yards, 3:27.**
- BAL – Zay Flowers 10-yard pass from Lamar Jackson (kick blocked), 3:28. Ravens 15–3. **Drive: 10 plays, 80 yards, 5:11.**
- BAL – Justin Tucker 29-yard field goal, 0:00. Ravens 18–3. **Drive: 1 play, 0 yards, 0:01.**

**Third quarter**

- TEN – Nick Folk 27-yard field goal, 9:24. Ravens 18–6. **Drive: 7 plays, 83 yards, 2:31.**
- TEN – Derrick Henry 15-yard run (Nick Folk kick), 8:24. Ravens 18–13. **Drive: 1 play, 25 yards, 0:13.**

**Fourth quarter**

- BAL – Justin Tucker 20-yard field goal, 12:49. Ravens 21–13. **Drive: 13 plays, 54 yards, 6:38.**
- BAL – Justin Tucker 36-yard field goal, 04:16. Ravens 24–13. **Drive: 11 plays, 71 yards, 4:39.**
- TEN – Nick Folk 38-yard field goal, 0:38. Ravens 24–16. **Drive: 10 plays, 55 yards, 3:38.**

**Top passers**

- BAL – Lamar Jackson – 21/30, 223 yards, TD, INT
- TEN – Ryan Tannehill – 8/16, 76 yards, INT

**Top rushers**

- BAL – Lamar Jackson – 13 rushes, 62 yards
- TEN – Derrick Henry – 12 rushes, 97 yards, TD

**Top receivers**

- BAL – Mark Andrews – 4 receptions, 69 yards
- TEN – Tyjae Spears – 1 reception, 48 yards

K Justin Tucker converted six field goals (he had a PAT blocked) and the Ravens defense forced two turnovers (albeit one was off of a muffed punt) and recorded six sacks in a 24–16 win over the Titans in the Ravens’ second ever game in London. The Ravens won despite converting only one of their six red zone drives into a touchdown (the other five ended in field goals) and losing S Kyle Hamilton when he was ejected for a targeting penalty on Titans WR and former Raven Chris Moore in the third quarter. Jackson led the team in passing (223) and rushing (62) yards with his lone TD pass going to WR Zay Flowers, which was the first of Flowers’ career. With the win, the Ravens improved to 4–2.

==== Week 7: Baltimore Ravens 38, Detroit Lions 6 ====
Week 7: Detroit Lions at Baltimore Ravens – Game summary

Quarter	1	2	3	4	Total
Lions	0	0	0	6	**6**
**Ravens**	14	14	7	3	**38**

at M&T Bank Stadium, Baltimore, Maryland

- Date: October 22
- Game time: 1:00 p.m. EDT
- Game weather: Partly cloudy, 62 °F (17 °C)
- Game attendance: 70,989
- Referee: Brad Rogers
- TV announcers (Fox): Kevin Burkhardt, Greg Olsen, Tom Rinaldi and Erin Andrews
- Recap, Game Book

Game information

**First quarter**

- BAL – Lamar Jackson 7-yard run (Justin Tucker kick), 10:37. Ravens 7–0. **Drive: 7 plays, 75 yards, 4:23.**
- BAL – Nelson Agholor 12-yard pass from Lamar Jackson (Justin Tucker kick), 3:11. Ravens 14–0. **Drive: 11 plays, 68 yards, 5:46.**

**Second quarter**

- BAL – Mark Andrews 11-yard pass from Lamar Jackson (Justin Tucker kick), 12:54. Ravens 21–0. **Drive: 8 plays, 92 yards, 3:57.**
- BAL – Gus Edwards 2-yard run (Justin Tucker kick), 7:45. Ravens 28–0. **Drive: 6 plays, 80 yards, 2:56.**

**Third quarter**

- BAL – Mark Andrews 8-yard pass from Lamar Jackson (Justin Tucker kick), 7:25. Ravens 35–0. **Drive: 4 plays, 94 yards, 2:06**

**Fourth quarter**

- DET – Jahmyr Gibbs 21-yard run (pass failed), 13:59. Ravens 35–6. **Drive: 8 plays, 77 yards, 3:31.**
- BAL – Justin Tucker 32-yard field goal, 9:30. Ravens 38–6. **Drive: 7 plays, 29 yards, 4:29.**

**Top passers**

- DET – Jared Goff – 33/53, 284 yards, INT
- BAL – Lamar Jackson – 21/27, 357 yards, 3 TD

**Top rushers**

- DET – Jahmyr Gibbs – 11 rushes, 68 yards, TD
- BAL – Gus Edwards – 14 rushes, 64 yards, TD

**Top receivers**

- DET – Amon-Ra St. Brown – 13 receptions, 102 yards
- BAL – Gus Edwards – 1 reception, 80 yards

In week 7, the division-leading Lions visited the Baltimore Ravens. The Ravens scored 14 points in the first quarter via a seven-yard touchdown run from Lamar Jackson and a 12-yard touchdown pass from Jackson to Nelson Agholor. The Ravens scored 14 points in the second quarter via an 11-yard touchdown pass from Jackson to Mark Andrews and a two-yard touchdown run from Gus Edwards, which made the score 28–0 in favor of Baltimore at half-time. The Ravens extended their lead in the third quarter via an eight-yard touchdown pass from Jackson to Andrews. The Lions finally got on the board in the fourth quarter via a 21-yard touchdown run from Jahmyr Gibbs. The Ravens scored the final points of the game via a 32-yard field goal by Justin Tucker, making the final score 38–6 in favor of Baltimore. With the win, the Ravens improved to 5–2.

==== Week 8: Baltimore Ravens 31, Arizona Cardinals 24 ====
Week 8: Baltimore Ravens at Arizona Cardinals – Game summary

Quarter	1	2	3	4	Total
**Ravens**	7	7	7	10	**31**
Cardinals	7	0	0	17	**24**

at State Farm Stadium, Glendale, Arizona

- Date: October 29
- Game time: 4:25 p.m. EDT/1:25 p.m. MST
- Game weather: None (retractable roof closed)
- Game attendance: 63,064
- Referee: Tra Blake
- TV announcers (CBS): Chris Lewis, Ross Tucker and Justin Walters
- Recap, Game Book

Game information

**First quarter**

- ARI – Josh Dobbs 1-yard run (Matt Prater kick), 8:05. Cardinals 7–0. **Drive: 12 plays, 75 yards, 6:55.**
- BAL – Mark Andrews 5-yard pass from Lamar Jackson (Justin Tucker kick), 2:38. Tied 7–7. **Drive: 10 plays, 75 yards, 5:27.**

**Second quarter**

- BAL – Gus Edwards 1-yard rush (Justin Tucker kick), 0:25. Ravens 14–7. **Drive: 6 plays, 43 yards, 1:32.**

**Third quarter**

- BAL – Gus Edwards 7-yard rush (Justin Tucker kick), 0:40. Ravens 21–7. **Drive: 3 plays, 23 yards, 1:05.**

**Fourth quarter**

- BAL – Justin Tucker 48-yard field goal, 9:27. Ravens 24–7. **Drive: 8 plays, 37 yards, 4:49.**
- ARI – Trey McBride 17-yard pass from Josh Dobbs (Josh Dobbs run), 6:32. Ravens 24-15. **Drive: 9 plays, 75 yards, 2:55.**
- BAL – Gus Edwards 1-yard rush (Justin Tucker kick), 2:51. Ravens 31–15. **Drive: 9 plays, 75 yards, 3:41.**
- ARI – Marquise Brown 1-yard pass from Josh Dobbs (pass failed), 1:14. Ravens 31-21. **Drive: 10 plays, 75 yards, 1:31.**
- ARI – Matt Prater 47-yard field goal, 0:26. Ravens 31–24. **Drive: 5 plays, 21 yards, 0:48.**

**Top passers**

- BAL – Lamar Jackson – 18/27, 157 yards, TD
- ARI – Josh Dobbs – 25/37, 208 yards, 2 TD, 2 INT

**Top rushers**

- BAL – Gus Edwards – 19 rushes, 80 yards, 3 TD
- ARI – Emari Demercado – 20 rushes, 78 yards

**Top receivers**

- BAL – Mark Andrews – 4 receptions, 40 yards, TD
- ARI – Trey McBride – 10 receptions, 95 yards, TD

Behind a career day by RB Gus Edwards and two interceptions by the defense off of Cardinals’ QB Josh Dobbs, the Ravens overcame some inconsistencies on offense and held off the Cardinals for a 31–24 win. Edwards had 19 carries for 80 yards and a career-high three touchdowns along with two receptions for 14 yards. With the win, the Ravens improved to 6–2.

==== Week 9: Baltimore Ravens 37, Seattle Seahawks 3 ====
Week 9: Seattle Seahawks at Baltimore Ravens – Game summary

Quarter	1	2	3	4	Total
Seahawks	0	3	0	0	**3**
**Ravens**	0	17	13	7	**37**

at M&T Bank Stadium, Baltimore, Maryland

- Date: November 5
- Game time: 1:00 p.m. EST
- Game weather: Clear, 69 °F (21 °C)
- Game attendance: 70,753
- Referee: Shawn Hochuli
- TV announcers (CBS): Jim Nantz, Tony Romo and Tracy Wolfson
- Recap, Game Book

Game information

**First quarter**

- No scoring plays.

**Second quarter**

- BAL – Gus Edwards 4-yard run (Justin Tucker kick), 13:06. Ravens 7–0. **Drive: 12 play, 81 yards, 5:35.**
- BAL – Gus Edwards 3-yard run (Justin Tucker kick), 2:39. Ravens 14–0. **Drive: 10 play, 84 yards, 5:48.**
- SEA – Jason Myers 33-yard field goal, 0:59. Ravens 14–3. **Drive: 7 plays, 60 yards, 1:40.**
- BAL – Justin Tucker 37-yard field goal, 0:04. Ravens 17–3. **Drive: 5 plays, 17 yards, 0:29.**

**Third quarter**

- BAL – Justin Tucker 45-yard field goal, 12:44. Ravens 20–3. **Drive: 5 plays, 49 yards, 2:16.**
- BAL – Justin Tucker 31-yard field goal, 3:28. Ravens 23–3. **Drive: 13 plays, 48 yards, 7:48.**
- BAL – Keaton Mitchell 40-yard run (Justin Tucker kick), 0:29. Ravens 30–3. **Drive: 3 play, 60 yards, 1:23.**

**Fourth quarter**

- BAL – Odell Beckham Jr. 6-yard pass from Tyler Huntley (Justin Tucker kick), 8:14. Ravens 37–3. **Drive: 8 plays, 78 yards, 3:56.**

**Top passers**

- SEA – Geno Smith – 13/28, 157 yards, INT
- BAL – Lamar Jackson – 21/26, 187 yards

**Top rushers**

- SEA – Kenneth Walker III – 9 rushes, 16 yards
- BAL – Keaton Mitchell – 9 rushes, 138 yards, TD

**Top receivers**

- SEA – Jaxon Smith-Njigba – 6 reception, 63 yards
- BAL – Mark Andrews – 9 receptions, 80 yards

For the second time in three weeks, the Ravens blew out a division leader with a 37–3 rout of the Seattle Seahawks. Undrafted rookie Keaton Mitchell ran for 138 yards and a touchdown on nine carries; he had not had a rushing attempt prior to this game, and he was named the FedEx Ground Player of the Week for his performance. The Ravens would rush for 298 yards and three touchdowns as a team while the defense held the Seahawks to just 151 total yards on offense. WR Odell Beckham Jr., who was playing on his 31st birthday, also caught his first touchdown as a Raven in the fourth quarter. With the win, the Ravens improved to 7–2.

==== Week 10: Cleveland Browns 33, Baltimore Ravens 31 ====
Week 10: Cleveland Browns at Baltimore Ravens – Game summary

Quarter	1	2	3	4	Total
**Browns**	3	6	8	16	**33**
Ravens	17	0	7	7	**31**

at M&T Bank Stadium, Baltimore, Maryland

- Date: November 12
- Game time: 1:00 p.m. EST
- Game weather: Clear, 49 °F (9 °C)
- Game attendance: 70,424
- Referee: Land Clark
- TV announcers (Fox): Kenny Albert, Jonathan Vilma and Shannon Spake
- Recap, Game Book

Game information

**First quarter**

- BAL – Kyle Hamilton 18-yard interception return (Justin Tucker kick), 14:20. Ravens 7-0.
- BAL – Keaton Mitchell 39-yard run (Justin Tucker kick), 10:13. Ravens 14–0. **Drive: 5 plays, 79 yards, 2:38.**
- CLE – Dustin Hopkins 36-yard field goal, 7:27. Ravens 14–3. **Drive: 10 plays, 49 yards, 2:46.**
- BAL – Justin Tucker 37-yard field goal, 3:29. Ravens 17–3. **Drive: 8 plays, 56 yards, 3:58.**

**Second quarter**

- CLE – Dustin Hopkins 28-yard field goal, 7:30. Ravens 17–6. **Drive: 12 plays, 70 yards, 7:16.**
- CLE – Dustin Hopkins 23-yard field goal, 1:02. Ravens 17–9. **Drive: 6 plays, 33 yards, 1:12.**

**Third quarter**

- BAL – Odell Beckham Jr. 40-yard pass from Lamar Jackson (Justin Tucker kick), 12:29. Ravens 24–9. **Drive: 6 plays, 78 yards, 2:31.**
- CLE – Kareem Hunt 3-yard run (Deshaun Watson run), 2:20. Ravens 24–17. **Drive: 17 plays, 75 yards, 10:09.**

**Fourth quarter**

- BAL – Gus Edwards 3-yard run (Justin Tucker kick), 11:34. Ravens 31–17. **Drive: 7 plays, 12 yards, 3:17.**
- CLE – Elijah Moore 10-yard pass from Deshaun Watson (Dustin Hopkins kick), 8:57. Ravens 31–24. **Drive: 6 plays, 75 yards, 2:37.**
- CLE – Greg Newsome 32-yard interception return (kick failed), 8:16. Ravens 31-30.
- CLE – Dustin Hopkins 40-yard field goal, 0:00. Browns 33–31. **Drive: 12 plays, 58 yards, 1:12.**

**Top passers**

- CLE – Deshaun Watson – 20/34, 213 yards, TD, INT
- BAL – Lamar Jackson – 13/23, 223 yards, TD, 2 INT

**Top rushers**

- CLE – Jerome Ford – 17 rushes, 107 yards
- BAL – Lamar Jackson – 8 rushes, 41 yards

**Top receivers**

- CLE – Amari Cooper – 6 receptions, 98 yards
- BAL – Zay Flowers – 5 receptions, 73 yards

Despite taking an early 14–0 lead, leading by as much as 15 points in the third quarter, and being up 31–17 with 10 minutes left in the 4th quarter, Baltimore allowed Cleveland to score 16 unanswered points and lost as Dustin Hopkins kicked a game-winning field as time expired. Lamar Jackson led the team in passing and rushing, but also had a ball batted in the fourth quarter that led to a pick-six. With the loss, the Ravens fell to 7–3.

==== Week 11: Baltimore Ravens 34, Cincinnati Bengals 20 ====
Week 11: Cincinnati Bengals at Baltimore Ravens – Game summary

Quarter	1	2	3	4	Total
Bengals	3	7	3	7	**20**
**Ravens**	7	14	6	7	**34**

at M&T Bank Stadium, Baltimore, Maryland

- Date: November 16
- Game time: 8:15 p.m. EST
- Game weather: Clear, 56 °F (13 °C)
- Game attendance: 70,997
- Referee: Adrian Hill
- TV announcers (WMAR/Prime Video): Al Michaels, Kirk Herbstreit and Kaylee Hartung
- Recap, Game Book

Game information

**First quarter**

- BAL – Gus Edwards 3-yard run (Justin Tucker kick), 10:02. Ravens 7–0. **Drive: 9 plays, 75 yards, 4:58.**
- CIN – Evan McPherson 50-yard field goal, 7:32. Ravens 7–3. **Drive: 7 plays, 44 yards, 2:30.**

**Second quarter**

- CIN – Joe Mixon 4-yard pass from Joe Burrow (Evan McPherson kick), 5:49. Bengals 10–7. **Drive: 12 plays, 82 yards, 7:22.**
- BAL – Nelson Agholor 37-yard pass from Lamar Jackson (Justin Tucker kick), 2:20. Ravens 14–10. **Drive: 7 plays, 75 yards, 3:29.**
- BAL – Rashod Bateman 10-yard pass from Lamar Jackson (Justin Tucker kick), 0:23. Ravens 21–10. **Drive: 7 plays, 80 yards, 1:07.**

**Third quarter**

- CIN – Evan McPherson 26-yard field goal, 9:56. Ravens 21–13. **Drive: 10 plays, 67 yards, 5:04.**
- BAL – Justin Tucker 25-yard field goal, 4:02. Ravens 24–13. **Drive: 10 plays, 68 yards, 5:54.**
- BAL – Justin Tucker 47-yard field goal, 0:26. Ravens 27–13. **Drive: 5 plays, 27 yards, 1:45.**

**Fourth quarter**

- BAL – Gus Edwards 3-yard run (Justin Tucker kick), 4:49. Ravens 34–13. **Drive: 6 plays, 68 yards, 3:36.**
- CIN – Ja'Marr Chase 2-yard pass from Jake Browning (Evan McPherson kick), 1:08. Ravens 34–20. **Drive: 8 plays, 75 yards, 3:41.**

**Top passers**

- CIN – Joe Burrow – 11/17, 101 yards, TD
- BAL – Lamar Jackson – 16/26, 264 yards, 2 TD

**Top rushers**

- CIN – Joe Mixon – 16 rushes, 69 yards
- BAL – Gus Edwards – 11 rushes, 61 yards, 2 TD

**Top receivers**

- CIN – Tanner Hudson – 4 receptions, 49 yards
- BAL – Odell Beckham Jr. – 4 receptions, 116 yards

The Ravens completed a season sweep of the Cincinnati Bengals with a 34–20 win at home. QB Lamar Jackson threw for two touchdowns and RB Gus Edwards ran for two more. However, the Ravens lost All-Pro TE Mark Andrews to a severe ankle injury, although he would return during the team's playoff run. With the win, the Ravens improved to 8–3.

==== Week 12: Baltimore Ravens 20, Los Angeles Chargers 10 ====
Week 12: Baltimore Ravens at Los Angeles Chargers – Game summary

Quarter	1	2	3	4	Total
**Ravens**	0	10	3	7	**20**
Chargers	3	0	0	7	**10**

at SoFi Stadium, Inglewood, California

- Date: November 26
- Game time: 8:15 p.m. EST/5:15 p.m. PST
- Game weather: 64 °F (18 °C) (retractable roof open)
- Game attendance: 70,240
- Referee: Alan Eck
- TV announcers (NBC): Mike Tirico, Jason Garrett and Melissa Stark
- Recap, Game Book

Game information

**First quarter**

- LAC – Cameron Dicker 39-yard field goal, 9:03. Chargers 3–0. **Drive: 12 plays, 54 yards, 5:57.**

**Second quarter**

- BAL – Zay Flowers 3-yard pass from Lamar Jackson (Justin Tucker kick), 10:41. Ravens 7–3. **Drive: 12 plays, 78 yards, 6:21.**
- BAL – Justin Tucker 42-yard field goal, 1:12. Ravens 10–3. **Drive: 5 plays, 10 yards, 2:21.**

**Third quarter**

- BAL – Justin Tucker 48-yard field goal, 10:53. Ravens 13–3. **Drive: 9 plays, 45 yards, 4:07.**

**Fourth quarter**

- LAC – Gerald Everett 3-yard pass from Justin Herbert (Cameron Dicker kick), 8:32. Ravens 13–10. **Drive: 7 plays, 60 yards, 2:51.**
- BAL – Zay Flowers 37-yard rush (Justin Tucker kick), 1:36. Ravens 20–10. **Drive: 3 plays, 44 yards, 0:18.**

**Top passers**

- BAL – Lamar Jackson – 18/32, 177 yards, TD
- LAC – Justin Herbert – 29/44, 217 yards, TD, INT

**Top rushers**

- BAL – Keaton Mitchell – 9 rushes, 64 yards
- LAC – Justin Herbert – 4 rushes, 47 yards

**Top receivers**

- BAL – Isaiah Likely – 4 receptions, 40 yards
- LAC – Keenan Allen – 14 receptions, 106 yards

The Ravens defense forced four Chargers turnovers in five drives, helping the Ravens to overcome a sluggish offensive performance deep into the fourth quarter. The Chargers had a chance to tie or take the lead late in the fourth quarter down only 10–13 after a Justin Tucker missed FG, but they turned the ball over on downs after failing to convert a 4th and 6 from the Baltimore 46 yard-line just after the two-minute warning. WR Zay Flowers then scored on a rushing TD, his second TD of the game, and the Chargers turned the ball over on downs again on the ensuing drive, preserving the 20–10 win and improving the Ravens’ record to 9–3 as they headed into their bye week.

==== Week 14: Baltimore Ravens 37, Los Angeles Rams 31 ====
Week 14: Los Angeles Rams at Baltimore Ravens – Game summary

Quarter	1	2	3	4	OT	Total
Rams	3	17	2	9	0	**31**
**Ravens**	7	10	3	11	6	**37**

at M&T Bank Stadium, Baltimore, Maryland

- Date: December 10
- Game time: 1:00 p.m. EST
- Game weather: Rain, 57 °F (14 °C)
- Game attendance: 70,492
- Referee: Scott Novak
- TV announcers (Fox): Joe Davis, Daryl Johnston and Pam Oliver
- Recap, Game Book

Game information

**First quarter**

- LAR –Lucas Havrisik 27-yard field goal, 5:35. Rams 3–0. **Drive: 13 plays, 67 yards, 6:01.**
- BAL – Isaiah Likely 54-yard pass from Lamar Jackson (Justin Tucker kick), 0:25. Ravens 7–3. **Drive: 3 plays, 66 yards, 1:29.**

**Second quarter**

- LAR – Cooper Kupp 6-yard pass from Matthew Stafford (Lucas Havrisik kick), 12:01. Rams 10–7. **Drive: 7 plays, 75 yards, 3:24.**
- BAL – Odell Beckham Jr. 46-yard pass from Lamar Jackson (Justin Tucker kick), 9:40. Ravens 14–10. **Drive: 5 plays, 75 yards, 2:21.**
- LAR – Davis Allen 7-yard pass from Matthew Stafford (Lucas Havrisik kick), 5:00. Rams 17–14. **Drive: 9 plays, 75 yards, 4:40.**
- LAR – Lucas Havrisik 51-yard field goal, 1:45. Rams 20–14. **Drive: 7 plays, 18 yards, 3:01.**
- BAL – Justin Tucker 31-yard field goal, 0:09. Rams 20–17. **Drive: 12 plays, 62 yards, 1:36.**

**Third quarter**

- BAL – Justin Tucker 47-yard field goal, 10:02. Tied 20–20. **Drive: 8 plays, 49 yards, 3:32.**
- LAR - Tyler Linderbaum fumble out of bounds in end zone for a safety, 5:54. Rams 22–20.

**Fourth quarter**

- BAL – Justin Tucker 33-yard field goal, 11:17. Ravens 23–22. **Drive: 12 plays, 65 yards, 5:48.**
- LAR – Demarcus Robinson 5-yard pass from Matthew Stafford (pass failed), 4:41. Rams 28–23. **Drive: 8 plays, 85 yards, 3:20.**
- BAL – Zay Flowers 21-yard pass from Lamar Jackson (Lamar Jackson-Zay Flowers pass), 1:16. Ravens 31–28. **Drive: 13 plays, 75 yards, 1:09.**
- LAR – Lucas Havrisik 36-yard field goal, 0:07. Tied 31–31. **Drive: 7 plays, 57 yards, 1:09.**

**Overtime**

- BAL – Tylan Wallace 76-yard punt return, 7:42. Ravens 37–31.

**Top passers**

- LAR – Matthew Stafford – 23/41, 294 yards, 3 TD
- BAL – Lamar Jackson – 24/43, 316 yards, 3 TD, INT

**Top rushers**

- LAR – Kyren Williams – 25 rushes, 114 yards
- BAL – Lamar Jackson – 11 rushes, 70 yards

**Top receivers**

- LAR – Cooper Kupp – 8 receptions, 115 yards, TD
- BAL – Odell Beckham Jr. – 4 receptions, 97 yards, TD

In a surprisingly back and forth shootout, backup punt returner Tylan Wallace returned a punt 76 yards for a walk-off overtime touchdown for a 37–31 win. Jackson threw for 316 yards, three touchdowns, and an interception while also rushing for 70 yards. He led the Ravens on a go-ahead touchdown drive late in the fourth quarter before the Rams tied it at 31-all with a field goal with :07 left in regulation. With the victory, the Ravens improved to 10–3 and took control of the AFC's number one seed when the Miami Dolphins lost to the Tennessee Titans the next day.

==== Week 15: Baltimore Ravens 23, Jacksonville Jaguars 7 ====
Week 15: Baltimore Ravens at Jacksonville Jaguars – Game summary

Quarter	1	2	3	4	Total
**Ravens**	3	7	0	13	**23**
Jaguars	0	0	7	0	**7**

at EverBank Stadium, Jacksonville, Florida

- Date: December 17
- Game time: 8:15 p.m. EST
- Game weather: 58 °F (14 °C)
- Game attendance: 68,021
- Referee: Shawn Smith
- TV announcers (NBC): Mike Tirico, Cris Collinsworth, and Melissa Stark
- Recap, Game Book

Game information

**First quarter**

- BAL – Justin Tucker 43-yard field goal, 6:21. Ravens 3–0. **Drive: 11 plays, 64 yards, 5:51.**

**Second quarter**

- BAL – Isaiah Likely 16-yard pass from Lamar Jackson (Justin Tucker kick), 1:12. Ravens 10–0. **Drive: 13 plays, 60 yards, 4:30.**

**Third quarter**

- JAX – Jamal Agnew 65-yard pass from Trevor Lawrence (Brandon McManus kick), 7:15. Ravens 10–7. **Drive: 5 plays, 88 yards, 2:59.**

**Fourth quarter**

- BAL – Gus Edwards 1-yard run (Justin Tucker kick), 14:58. Ravens 17–7. **Drive: 5 plays, 58 yards, 2:17.**
- BAL – Justin Tucker 26-yard field goal, 8:00. Ravens 20–7. **Drive: 10 plays, 69 yards, 5:32.**
- BAL – Justin Tucker 34-yard field goal, 6:01. Ravens 23–7. **Drive: 4 plays, 3 yards, 1:35.**

**Top passers**

- BAL – Lamar Jackson – 14/24, 171 yards, TD, INT
- JAX – Trevor Lawrence – 25/43, 263 yards, TD

**Top rushers**

- BAL – Lamar Jackson – 12 rushes, 97 yards
- JAX – Trevor Lawrence – 4 rushes, 41 yards

**Top receivers**

- BAL – Isaiah Likely – 5 receptions, 70 yards, TD
- JAX – Jamal Agnew – 2 receptions, 70 yards, TD

The Ravens became the 1st AFC team to clinch a playoff berth with the 23–7 win over the Jacksonville Jaguars along with losses by both the Denver Broncos and the Pittsburgh Steelers. The Jaguars made multiple mistakes that cost them points on their last four drives of the 1st half. Down 0–3, Jaguars K Brandon McManus missed back-to-back field goals on consecutive drives before QB Trevor Lawrence inexplicably fumbled the ball away while scrambling on a 3rd and 17 deep in Baltimore territory. On the last drive of the half following a Baltimore TD that gave them a 10–0 lead, Lawrence completed a 36-yard pass to WR Zay Jones to give them 1st and Goal at Baltimore 5-yard line with less than 30 seconds to go in the half. However, despite having no timeouts, the Jaguars tried to run another pass play instead of spiking the ball to stop the clock. It backfired as WR Parker Washington caught a pass and was tackled in bounds after gaining only a yard, which caused the clock to run out before the Jaguars could spike it. The Jaguars would score a long TD on their first drive of the 2nd half to close the gap to 7–10, but the Ravens outscored them 13–0 the rest of the way to secure the victory. QB Lamar Jackson threw for 171 yards, a TD, and an INT, while also leading the team in rushing with 92 yards. However, the Ravens did lose rookie RB Keaton Mitchell when he suffered an ACL tear early in the fourth quarter, ending his season. With the win, the Ravens improved to 11–3.

==== Week 16: Baltimore Ravens 33, San Francisco 49ers 19 ====
Christmas Day games

Week 16: Baltimore Ravens at San Francisco 49ers – Game summary

Quarter	1	2	3	4	Total
**Ravens**	3	13	17	0	**33**
49ers	5	7	0	7	**19**

at Levi's Stadium, Santa Clara, California

- Date: December 25
- Game time: 8:15 p.m. EST/5:15 p.m. PST
- Game weather: Cloudy, 56 °F (13 °C)
- Game attendance: 71,812
- Referee: Bill Vinovich
- TV announcers (ABC/ESPN+): Joe Buck, Troy Aikman, and Lisa Salters
- Recap, Game Book

Game information

**First quarter**

- SF – Penalty on Lamar Jackson enforced in end zone for a Safety, 10:24. 49ers 2–0.
- SF – Jake Moody 45-yard field goal, 5:58. 49ers 5–0. **Drive: 10 plays, 52 yards, 4:26.**
- BAL – Justin Tucker 28-yard field goal, 0:57. 49ers 5–3. **Drive: 8 plays, 65 yards, 5:01.**

**Second quarter**

- BAL – Gus Edwards 1-yard run (Justin Tucker kick), 9:35. Ravens 10–5. **Drive: 11 plays, 53 yards, 4:41.**
- BAL – Justin Tucker 41-yard field goal, 7:03. Ravens 13–5. **Drive: 4 plays, 3 yards, 0:51.**
- SF – Christian McCaffrey 9-yard run (Jake Moody kick), 3:23. Ravens 13–12. **Drive: 6 plays, 67 yards, 3:40.**
- BAL – Justin Tucker 28-yard field goal, 0:00. Ravens 16–12. **Drive: 11 plays, 64 yards, 3:23.**

**Third quarter**

- BAL – Nelson Agholor 6-yard pass from Lamar Jackson (Justin Tucker kick), 12:07. Ravens 23–12. **Drive: 3 plays, 44 yards, 1:10.**
- BAL – Zay Flowers 9-yard pass from Lamar Jackson (Justin Tucker kick), 11:49. Ravens 30–12. **Drive: 1 play, 9 yards, 0:03.**
- BAL – Justin Tucker 24-yard field goal, 2:39. Ravens 33–12. **Drive: 11 plays, 89 yards, 6:42.**

**Fourth quarter**

- SF – Ronnie Bell 12-yard pass from Sam Darnold (Jake Moody kick), 6:19. Ravens 33–19. **Drive: 12 plays, 90 yards, 4:05.**

**Top passers**

- BAL – Lamar Jackson – 23/35, 252 yards, 2 TD
- SF – Brock Purdy – 18/32, 255 yards, 4 INT

**Top rushers**

- BAL – Lamar Jackson – 7 rushes, 45 yards
- SF – Christian McCaffrey – 13 rushes, 102 yards, TD

**Top receivers**

- BAL – Zay Flowers – 9 receptions, 72 yards, TD
- SF – George Kittle – 7 receptions, 126 yards

Despite both teams coming into this game at the top of their respective conferences at 11–3, the Ravens were large underdogs (+6). Things got off to a rough start, with intentional grounding called in the endzone on Lamar Jackson after he tripped over a referee, giving the 49ers a safety and thus a 2–0 lead, which the 49ers would extend to 5–0. However, the Ravens would settle down and dominate the rest of the game. The defense forced four Brock Purdy interceptions (he was later knocked out of the game due to a stinger in the fourth quarter) while Jackson led the offense to seven consecutive scoring drives to open up a 33–12 lead. The 49ers attempted to come back in the fourth quarter, but the game was sealed when the Ravens picked off Sam Darnold in the end zone with less than two minutes to go as the Ravens won by a final score of 33–19. This win moved Baltimore to 12–3 on the season, along with sealing a 7–1 season road record.

==== Week 17: Baltimore Ravens 56, Miami Dolphins 19 ====
Week 17: Miami Dolphins at Baltimore Ravens – Game summary

Quarter	1	2	3	4	Total
Dolphins	10	3	0	6	**19**
**Ravens**	7	21	7	21	**56**

at M&T Bank Stadium, Baltimore, Maryland

- Date: December 31
- Game time: 1:00 p.m. EST
- Game weather: Clear, 50 °F (10 °C)
- Game attendance: 71,196
- Referee: Clete Blakeman
- TV announcers (CBS): Ian Eagle, Charles Davis and Evan Washburn
- Recap, Game Book

Game information

**First quarter**

- MIA – Cedrick Wilson Jr. 8-yard pass from Tua Tagovailoa (Jason Sanders kick), 11:00. Dolphins 7–0. **Drive: 8 plays, 75 yards, 4:00.**
- BAL – Justice Hill 20-yard pass from Lamar Jackson (Justin Tucker kick), 6:39. Tied 7–7. **Drive: 7 plays, 75 yards, 4:21.**
- MIA – Jason Sanders 27-yard field goal, 3:39. Dolphins 10–7. **Drive: 6 plays, 65 yards, 3:00.**

**Second quarter**

- BAL – Gus Edwards 1-yard run (Justin Tucker kick), 6:56. Ravens 14–10. **Drive: 10 plays, 89 yards, 5:50.**
- MIA – Jason Sanders 38-yard field goal, 3:10. Ravens 14–13. **Drive: 11 plays, 49 yards, 3:46.**
- BAL – Zay Flowers 75-yard pass from Lamar Jackson (Justin Tucker kick), 2:58. Ravens 21–13. **Drive: 1 play, 75 yards, 0:12.**
- BAL – Isaiah Likely 35-yard pass from Lamar Jackson (Justin Tucker kick), 1:24. Ravens 28–13. **Drive: 4 plays, 38 yards, 0:26.**

**Third quarter**

- BAL – Isaiah Likely 7-yard pass from Lamar Jackson (Justin Tucker kick), 13:29. Ravens 35–13. **Drive: 3 plays, 18 yards, 1:31.**

**Fourth quarter**

- MIA – De'Von Achane 1-yard pass from Tua Tagovailoa (pass failed), 13:57. Ravens 35–19. **Drive: 14 plays, 78 yards, 6:42.**
- BAL – Patrick Ricard 4-yard pass from Lamar Jackson (Justin Tucker kick), 9:38. Ravens 42–19. **Drive: 7 plays, 75 yards, 4:19.**
- BAL – Melvin Gordon III 7-yard run (Justin Tucker kick), 4:11. Ravens 49–19. **Drive: 6 plays, 32 yards, 3:44.**
- BAL – Charlie Kolar 19-yard pass from Tyler Huntley (Justin Tucker kick), 2:28. Ravens 56–19. **Drive: 3 plays, 8 yards, 1:35.**

**Top passers**

- MIA – Tua Tagovailoa – 22/38, 237 yards, 2 TD, 2 INT
- BAL – Lamar Jackson – 18/21, 321 yards, 5 TD

**Top rushers**

- MIA – De'Von Achane – 14 rushes, 107 yards
- BAL – Gus Edwards – 16 rush, 68 yards, TD

**Top receivers**

- MIA – Tyreek Hill – 6 receptions, 76 yards
- BAL – Zay Flowers – 3 receptions, 106 yards, TD

The Ravens won the AFC North and clinched homefield advantage throughout the playoffs with a 56–19 blowout win over the Miami Dolphins, their fifth win over a division leader in the 2023 season, which made up for the big lead they blew against the Dolphins in Week 2 of the previous season. QB Lamar Jackson threw for 321 yards and career-high tying five touchdowns and finished with a perfect passer rating, the third one of his career and his second against the Dolphins; he also rushed for 35 yards. Rookie WR Zay Flowers had three receptions for 106 yards, most of which came on a 75-yard touchdown reception from Jackson in the second quarter; it was Flowers first 100-yard receiving game as a pro. This was also the first game to end with a 56–19 final score. With the win, the Ravens improved to 13–3 and snapped their two-game losing streak to the Dolphins.

==== Week 18: Pittsburgh Steelers 17, Baltimore Ravens 10 ====
Week 18: Pittsburgh Steelers at Baltimore Ravens – Game summary

Quarter	1	2	3	4	Total
**Steelers**	7	0	0	10	**17**
Ravens	0	7	0	3	**10**

at M&T Bank Stadium, Baltimore, Maryland

- Date: January 6
- Game time: 4:30 p.m. EST
- Game weather: Rain, 38 °F (3 °C)
- Game attendance: 70,355
- Referee: Brad Allen
- TV announcers (ESPN/ABC/ESPN+): Chris Fowler, Louis Riddick, Dan Orlovsky and Laura Rutledge
- Recap, Game Book

Game information

**First quarter**

- PIT – Najee Harris 6-yard run (Chris Boswell kick), 2:36. Steelers 7–0. **Drive: 12 plays, 76 yards, 7:32.**

**Second quarter**

- BAL – Isaiah Likely 27-yard pass from Tyler Huntley (Justin Tucker kick), 2:19. Tied 7–7. **Drive: 6 plays, 71 yards, 2:48.**

**Third quarter**

- No scoring plays.

**Fourth quarter**

- PIT – Diontae Johnson 71-yard pass from Mason Rudolph (Chris Boswell kick), 14:49. Steelers 14–7. **Drive: 6 plays, 89 yards, 3:01.**
- PIT – Chris Boswell 25-yard field goal, 3:13. Steelers 17–7. **Drive: 9 plays, 25 yards, 4:01.**
- BAL – Justin Tucker 36-yard field goal, 0:16. Steelers 17–10. **Drive: 12 plays, 57 yards, 2:57.**

**Top passers**

- PIT – Mason Rudolph – 18/20, 152 yards, TD
- BAL – Tyler Huntley – 15/28, 146 yards, TD

**Top rushers**

- PIT – Najee Harris – 26 rushes, 112 yards, TD
- BAL – Gus Edwards – 10 rushes, 48 yards

**Top receivers**

- PIT – Diontae Johnson – 4 receptions, 89 yards, TD
- BAL – Nelson Agholor – 5 receptions, 39 yards

The Ravens rested multiple key starters, including Lamar Jackson, for their season finale at home against the Steelers. For the first time all season, the Ravens never led at all in a game, as they lost 10–17. The Ravens ended their season 13–4, extending their losing streak to the Steelers to three games, extending their losing streak in Baltimore against the Steelers to four games, and being swept by the Steelers for the third time in four years.

=== Standings ===
==== Division ====
AFC North
	W	L	T	PCT	DIV	CONF	PF	PA	STK
^{(1)} Baltimore Ravens	13	4	0	.765	3–3	8–4	483	280	L1
^{(5)} Cleveland Browns	11	6	0	.647	3–3	8–4	396	362	L1
^{(7)} Pittsburgh Steelers	10	7	0	.588	5–1	7–5	304	324	W3
Cincinnati Bengals	9	8	0	.529	1–5	4–8	366	384	W1

==== Conference ====
AFC
#	Team	Division	W	L	T	PCT	DIV	CONF	SOS	SOV	STK
**Division leaders**
1	Baltimore Ravens	North	13	4	0	.765	3–3	8–4	.543	.529	L1
2 (Note: Buffalo claimed the No. 2 seed over Kansas City based on head-to-head victory.) (Note: Buffalo finished ahead of Miami in the AFC East based on head-to-head sweep.)	Buffalo Bills	East	11	6	0	.647	4–2	7–5	.471	.471	W5
3	Kansas City Chiefs	West	11	6	0	.647	4–2	9–3	.481	.428	W2
4	Houston Texans	South	10	7	0	.588	4–2	7–5	.474	.465	W2
**Wild cards**
5 (Note: Cleveland claimed the No. 5 seed over Miami based on conference record.)	Cleveland Browns	North	11	6	0	.647	3–3	8–4	.536	.513	L1
6	Miami Dolphins	East	11	6	0	.647	4–2	7–5	.450	.358	L2
7	Pittsburgh Steelers	North	10	7	0	.588	5–1	7–5	.540	.571	W3
**Did not qualify for the postseason**
8 (Note: Cincinnati finished ahead of Jacksonville based on head-to-head victory. Division tie break was initially used to eliminate Indianapolis (see below).)	Cincinnati Bengals	North	9	8	0	.529	1–5	4–8	.574	.536	W1
9 (Note: Jacksonville finished ahead of Indianapolis based on head-to-head sweep.)	Jacksonville Jaguars	South	9	8	0	.529	4–2	6–6	.533	.477	L1
10	Indianapolis Colts	South	9	8	0	.529	3–3	7–5	.491	.444	L1
11 (Note: Las Vegas finished ahead of Denver based on head-to-head sweep.)	Las Vegas Raiders	West	8	9	0	.471	4–2	6–6	.488	.426	W1
12	Denver Broncos	West	8	9	0	.471	3–3	5–7	.488	.485	L1
13	New York Jets	East	7	10	0	.412	2–4	4–8	.502	.454	W1
14	Tennessee Titans	South	6	11	0	.353	1–5	4–8	.522	.422	W1
15	Los Angeles Chargers	West	5	12	0	.294	1–5	3–9	.529	.388	L5
16	New England Patriots	East	4	13	0	.235	2–4	4–8	.522	.529	L2
**Tiebreakers** (Note: When breaking ties for three or more teams under the NFL's rules, they are first broken within divisions, then comparing only the highest ranked remaining team from each division.)

== Postseason ==
=== Schedule ===
Round	Date	Opponent (seed)	Result	Record	Venue	Recap
Wild Card	First-round bye					
Divisional	January 20	Houston Texans (4)	W 34–10	1–0	M&T Bank Stadium	Recap
AFC Championship	January 28	Kansas City Chiefs (3)	L 10–17	1–1	M&T Bank Stadium	Recap

=== Game summaries ===
==== AFC Divisional Playoffs: vs. (4) Houston Texans ====
AFC Divisional Playoffs: (4) Houston Texans at (1) Baltimore Ravens – Game summary

Quarter	1	2	3	4	Total
Texans	3	7	0	0	10
Ravens	3	7	7	17	34

at M&T Bank Stadium, Baltimore, Maryland

- Date: January 20, 2024
- Game time: 4:30 p.m. EST
- Game weather: Clear, 27 °F (−3 °C)
- Game attendance: 71,018
- Referee: John Hussey
- TV announcers (ESPN/ABC/ESPN+): Joe Buck, Troy Aikman, Lisa Salters and Laura Rutledge
- Recap, Game Book

Game information

First quarter

- BAL – Justin Tucker 53-yard field goal, 8:36. Ravens 3–0. Drive: 9 plays, 41 yards, 5:55.
- HOU – Kaʻimi Fairbairn 50-yard field goal, 0:28. Tied 3–3. Drive: 8 plays, 23 yards, 2:54.

Second quarter

- BAL – Nelson Agholor 3-yard pass from Lamar Jackson (Justin Tucker kick), 9:14. Ravens 10–3. Drive: 11 plays, 76 yards, 6:14.
- HOU – Steven Sims 67-yard punt return, 4:17. Tied 10–10.

Third quarter

- BAL – Lamar Jackson 15-yard run (Justin Tucker kick), 12:04. Ravens 17–10. Drive: 6 plays, 55 yards, 2:56.

Fourth quarter

- BAL – Isaiah Likely 15-yard pass from Lamar Jackson (Justin Tucker kick), 14:23. Ravens 24–10. Drive: 12 plays, 93 yards, 7:03.
- BAL – Lamar Jackson 8-yard run (Justin Tucker kick), 6:20. Ravens 31–10. Drive: 11 plays, 78 yards, 7:10.
- BAL – Justin Tucker 43-yard field goal, 1:56. Ravens 34–10. Drive: 8 plays, 8 yards, 3:08.

Top passers

- HOU – C. J. Stroud – 18/32, 165 yards
- BAL – Lamar Jackson – 16/22, 152 yards, 2 TD

Top rushers

- HOU – Devin Singletary – 9 rushes, 22 yards
- BAL – Lamar Jackson – 11 rushes, 100 yards, 2 TD

Top receivers

- HOU – Nico Collins – 4 receptions, 58 yards
- BAL – Zay Flowers – 4 receptions, 41 yards

This was the second postseason meeting between the Ravens and Texans. The first was the 2011 AFC Divisional playoffs, which the Ravens won by a score of 20–13 in Baltimore.

Despite a ragged offensive start in the first half, Lamar Jackson and the Ravens’ offense would settle into a groove in the second half, outscoring Houston 24–0. Though not getting a takeaway nor recording a sack on rookie quarterback C. J. Stroud, the Ravens defense dominated Houston. They did not allow any offensive plays by Houston inside the Ravens' 25 yard line nor gave up an offensive touchdown. Houston's only points came by a field goal and a punt return touchdown in the first half. The Baltimore crowd noise also caused a litany of Houston pre-snap penalties. Baltimore would eventually win by a final score of 34–10, advancing to their first AFC Championship Game since 2012, their first home AFC Championship Game in franchise history and the first in Baltimore since the Baltimore Colts hosted in 1971. This was also their first home playoff win since the 2012 AFC Wild Card playoffs.

Jackson completed 16 of his 22 passing attempts for 152 yards and two touchdowns, and also rushed for 100 yards with two rushing touchdowns.

==== AFC Championship: vs. (3) Kansas City Chiefs ====
AFC Championship: (3) Kansas City Chiefs at (1) Baltimore Ravens – Game summary

Quarter	1	2	3	4	Total
Chiefs	7	10	0	0	17
Ravens	7	0	0	3	10

at M&T Bank Stadium, Baltimore, Maryland

- Date: January 28, 2024
- Game time: 3:05 p.m. EST
- Game weather: Cloudy, 47 °F (8 °C)
- Game attendance: 71,439
- Referee: Shawn Smith
- TV announcers (CBS/Paramount+): Jim Nantz, Tony Romo, Tracy Wolfson, and Jay Feely
- Recap, Game Book

Game information

First quarter

- KC – Travis Kelce 19-yard pass from Patrick Mahomes (Harrison Butker kick), 7:41. Chiefs 7–0. Drive: 10 plays, 86 yards, 5:45.
- BAL – Zay Flowers 30-yard pass from Lamar Jackson (Justin Tucker kick), 4:58. Tied 7–7. Drive: 6 plays, 75 yards, 2:43.

Second quarter

- KC – Isiah Pacheco 2-yard run (Harrison Butker kick), 10:56. Chiefs 14–7. Drive: 16 plays, 75 yards, 9:02.
- KC – Harrison Butker 53-yard field goal, 0:04. Chiefs 17–7. Drive: 8 plays, 55 yards, 1:42.

Third quarter

- No scoring plays

Fourth quarter

- BAL – Justin Tucker 43-yard field goal, 2:34. Chiefs 17–10. Drive: 9 plays, 29 yards, 2:26.

Top passers

- KC – Patrick Mahomes – 30/39, 241 yards, TD
- BAL – Lamar Jackson – 20/37, 272 yards, TD, INT

Top rushers

- KC – Isiah Pacheco – 24 rushes, 68 yards, TD
- BAL – Lamar Jackson – 8 rushes, 54 yards

Top receivers

- KC – Travis Kelce – 11 receptions, 116 yards, TD
- BAL – Zay Flowers – 5 reception, 115 yards, TD

This was the Ravens' fifth appearance in the AFC Championship Game and second postseason meeting against the Kansas City Chiefs. The Chiefs were playing in their 6th consecutive AFC title game and the Ravens were attempting to reach their third Super Bowl in franchise history. The Ravens also hosted the AFC title game for the first time in franchise history.

The game was a relatively low-scoring game to decide the AFC's representation in Super Bowl LVIII. Both teams struggled offensively as the score was 17–7 at halftime, with the Chiefs scoring 10 points in the second quarter. The Ravens ended up turning the ball over a total of three times, with the final two turnovers coming during crucial drives during the fourth quarter. In the fourth quarter Zay Flowers fumbled the ball while plunging to the end zone goal line thus negating the scoring attempt by turning over the ball. The Ravens found themselves down 17–7 with 10:35 to go in the fourth quarter. The Ravens drove down the field to the Chiefs' 25-yard line until QB Lamar Jackson made a crucial mistake, throwing into triple coverage that was intercepted by Chiefs safety Deon Bush in the end zone. Despite the interception, the Ravens' defense allowed no points on the drive following the interception and the Ravens received the ball again. The Ravens would go down the field before settling for a field goal to cut the Chiefs' lead to seven. The Chiefs received the ball with 2:34 to go in the fourth and ultimately iced the game with a 32-yard pass to Marquez Valdes-Scantling to seal the Chiefs' second consecutive trip to the Super Bowl.

== Statistics ==
=== Team leaders ===
Category	Player	Total
Passing yards	Lamar Jackson	3,678
Passing touchdowns	Lamar Jackson	24
Rushing yards	Lamar Jackson	821
Rushing touchdowns	Gus Edwards	13
Receptions	Zay Flowers	77
Receiving yards	Zay Flowers	858
Receiving touchdowns	Mark Andrews	6
Points	Justin Tucker	149
Kickoff return yards	Devin Duvernay	174
Punt return yards	Devin Duvernay	290
Tackles	Roquan Smith	158
Sacks	Justin Madubuike	13.0
Interceptions	Geno Stone	7
Forced fumbles	Tied (Note: Jadeveon Clowney, Kyle Van Noy, Odafe Oweh, Jeremiah Moon)	2

Source: Pro-Football-Reference.com

=== League rankings ===
Category	Total yards	Yards per game	NFL rank (out of 32)
Passing offense	3,635	213.8	21st
Rushing offense	2,555	159.7	1st
Total offense	6,296	370.4	6th
Passing defense	3,263	191.9	6th
Rushing defense	1,860	109.4	14th
Total defense	5,123	301.4	6th

Source: ProFootballReference.com

== Individual awards ==
=== Regular season ===
Recipient	Award(s)
Lamar Jackson	Week 7: AFC Offensive Player of the Week; Week 17: AFC Offensive Player of the Week; Week 17: FedEx Air Player of the Week; December: AFC Offensive Player of the Month
Gus Edwards	Week 8: FedEx Ground Player of the Week
Keaton Mitchell	Week 9: FedEx Ground Player of the Week
Tylan Wallace	Week 14: AFC Special Teams Player of the Week
Kyle Hamilton	Week 16: AFC Defensive Player of the Week
Zay Flowers	Week 17: Pepsi NFL Rookie of the Week

=== Postseason ===
Recipient	Award(s)
Lamar Jackson	Pro Bowl; First team All-Pro; NFL MVP
Patrick Ricard	Second team All-Pro
Tyler Linderbaum	Pro Bowl
Justin Madubuike	Pro Bowl; Second team All-Pro
Roquan Smith	Pro Bowl; First team All-Pro
Patrick Queen	Pro Bowl; Second team All-Pro
Kyle Hamilton	Pro Bowl; First team All-Pro
Justin Tucker	Pro Bowl
