= Nnamdi Madubuike =

American football player (born 1997)

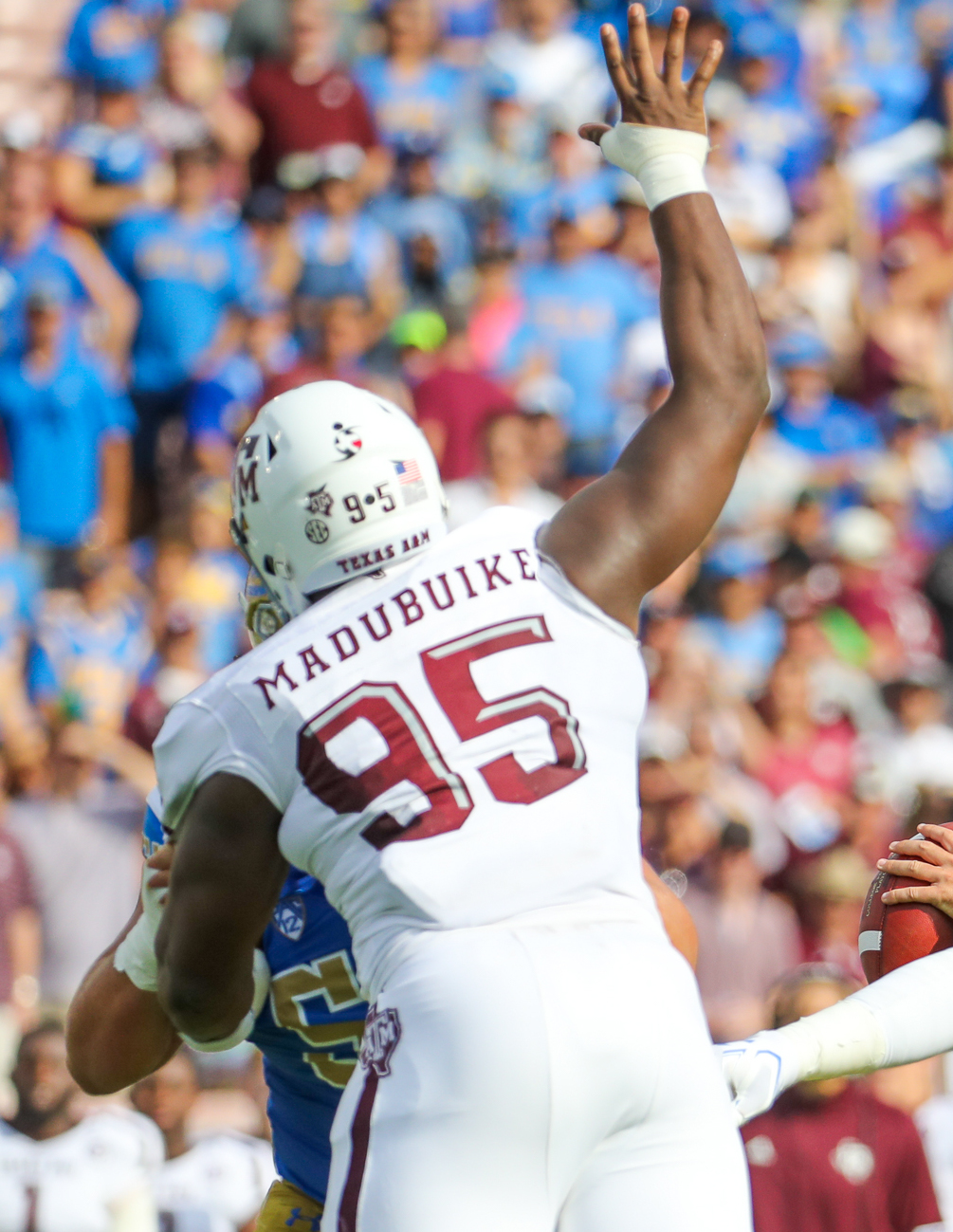
- Madubuike with the Texas A&M Aggies in 2017

No. 92 – Baltimore Ravens
- Position: Defensive tackle
- Roster status: Active

Personal information
- Born: November 17, 1997 (age 28); Dallas, Texas, U.S.
- Listed height: 6 ft 3 in (1.91 m)
- Listed weight: 305 lb (138 kg)

Career information
- High school: McKinney North (McKinney, Texas)
- College: Texas A&M (2016–2019)
- NFL draft: 2020: 3rd round, 71st overall pick

Career history
- Baltimore Ravens (2020–present)

Awards and highlights
- Second-team All-Pro (2023); 2× Pro Bowl (2023, 2024); Second-team All-SEC (2019)

Career NFL statistics as of 2025
- Total tackles: 203
- Sacks: 30
- Forced fumbles: 2
- Pass deflections: 6
- Stats at Pro Football Reference

Nnamdi Madubuike (/ˌmædəˈbiːkeɪ/ MAD-ə-BEE-kay; born November 17, 1997), formerly known as Justin Madubuike, is an American professional football defensive tackle for the Baltimore Ravens of the National Football League (NFL). He played college football for the Texas A&M Aggies.

== Early life ==
Nnamdi Madubuike was born in Dallas, Texas to Nigerian parents. Madubuike attended McKinney North High School in McKinney, Texas. He was selected to play in the 2016 U.S. Army All-American Game. He committed to Texas A&M University to play college football.

== College career ==
Madubuike redshirted his first year at Texas A&M in 2016. In 2017, he appeared in all 13 games, recording 20 tackles. He again appeared in all 13 games in 2018, finishing with 40 tackles and 5.5 sacks. As a junior he had 45 tackles and 5.5 sacks. After the season, he decided to forgo his senior season and entered the 2020 NFL draft. He decided to sit out the 2019 Texas Bowl.

== Professional career ==
Pre-draft measurables
Height	Weight	Arm length	Hand span	Wingspan	40-yard dash	10-yard split	20-yard split	Three-cone drill	Bench press
6 ft 2 5/8 in (1.90 m)	293 lb (133 kg)	33 1/2 in (0.85 m)	9 in (0.23 m)	6 ft 8 1/2 in (2.04 m)	4.83 s	1.73 s	2.85 s	7.37 s	31 reps
All values from NFL Combine

=== 2020 season ===
The Baltimore Ravens selected Madubuike with 71st overall pick in the third round of the 2020 NFL draft. He missed the first four games of the season after suffering a knee sprain late in training camp. Later that season, he was placed on the reserve/COVID-19 list by the team on November 27, 2020, becoming one of 18 players to be placed on that list prior to their Week 12 game against the Pittsburgh Steelers. He was activated on December 7. In Week 16 against the New York Giants, Madubuike recorded his first career sack on Daniel Jones during the 27–13 win. Although he was used somewhat sparingly during the season, he would play in 10 games with three starts with 19 combined tackles and 1.0 sacks.

=== 2021 season ===
Madubuike would see some more playing time down the stretch during the 2021 season due to the numerous injuries the Ravens endured during the season. He recorded his first sack of the season in the Ravens' 23–7 Week 4 win over Denver Broncos. He recorded another sack in the Ravens' 30–31 Week 15 loss over Green Bay Packers. He played in 15 games with 11 starts, finishing with 36 combined tackles, 2.0 sacks, and 2 pass-breakups.

=== 2022 season ===
Madubuike's production increased in his third season as a Raven. He played in all 17 games, starting all but one of them, recording 42 combined tackles, 5.5 sacks, and 3 pass-breakups.

=== 2023 season ===
Madubuike had a breakout season in 2023. He recorded at least a half-sack in 11 consecutive games between Weeks 4 to 14, tying the NFL record held by Jared Allen, Chris Jones, Trey Hendrickson, and Shaun Ellis. He recorded 2.0 sacks in the 24–16 Week 6 win over the Tennessee Titans. In the following week's 38–6 blowout win over the Detroit Lions, he strip sacked Jared Goff in the first quarter, although the fumble was recovered by the Lions Penei Sewell. In Week 12 against the Los Angeles Chargers, Madubuike became the first Raven since 2017 to reach double digit sacks after getting a half-sack on Justin Herbert in the second quarter (Travis Jones combined with Madubuike for the sack). His record-tying sack in Week 14 was a strip sack of Trevor Lawrence, with the resulting fumble recovered by Patrick Queen. He was named to his first career Pro Bowl on January 3, 2024. He was ranked 61st by his fellow players on the NFL Top 100 Players of 2024.

=== 2024 season ===
On March 5, 2024, the Ravens placed the franchise tag on Madubuike. Three days later, on March 8, the Ravens signed Madubuike to a four-year, $98 million contract extension.

During the 2024 regular season, Madubuike recorded 43 total tackles, 6.5 sacks, and 11 tackles for loss. He was named to his second consecutive Pro Bowl, but opted out and was replaced by Titans defensive tackle Jeffery Simmons.

=== 2025 season ===
During the 2025 regular season, Madubuike recorded two sacks and nine quarterback pressures in two games. Following the Ravens' 41–17 win against the Cleveland Browns in Week 2, Madubuike showed symptoms of what was later ruled a neck injury. On September 29, 2025, it was announced that Madubuike would miss the remainder of the season due to the neck injury. In April 2026, Madubuike had neck surgery that would allow him to play in the 2026 season.

=== 2026 season ===
On July 25, 2026, Madubuike was placed on the active/physically unable to perform (PUP) list. The Athletic reported that Madubuike had been cleared to practice by independent spine and cervical doctors, and that his placement on the PUP list was to give the Ravens time to evaluate his conditioning and acclimate his return to the field. Madubuike was removed from the PUP list on July 29.

== Career statistics ==
=== NFL ===
Legend
**Bold**	Career high

==== Regular season ====
Year	Team	Games		Tackles					Fumbles			
Year	Team	GP	GS	Cmb	Solo	Ast	Sck	TFL	FF	FR	Yds	TD
2020	BAL	10	3	19	11	8	1.0	2	0	0	0	0
2021	BAL	15	11	36	23	13	2.0	7	0	0	0	0
2022	BAL	17	16	42	26	16	5.5	8	0	0	0	0
2023	BAL	17	17	**56**	**38**	18	**13.0**	**12**	**1**	0	0	0
2024	BAL	17	17	43	21	**22**	6.5	11	**1**	0	0	0
2025	BAL	2	2	7	5	2	2.0	2	0	0	0	0
Career		78	66	203	124	79	30.0	42	2	0	0	0

==== Postseason ====
Year	Team	Games		Tackles					Fumbles			
Year	Team	GP	GS	Cmb	Solo	Ast	Sck	TFL	FF	FR	Yds	TD
2020	BAL	2	0	2	2	1	0.0	0	0	0	0	0
2022	BAL	1	1	2	0	2	0.0	0	0	0	0	0
2023	BAL	2	2	9	4	5	0.5	**1**	0	0	0	0
2024	BAL	2	2	**11**	**5**	**6**	**2.5**	**1**	0	0	0	0
Career		7	5	25	11	14	3.0	2	0	0	0	0

=== College ===
Legend
**Bold**	Career high

Season	Team	GP	Tackles					Fumbles				Interceptions			
Season	Team	GP	Solo	Ast	Comb	TFL	Sck	FF	FR	Yds	TD	Int	Yds	TD	PD
2017	Texas A&M	**13**	7	13	20	3	0.0	0	0	0	0	0	0	0	0
2018	Texas A&M	**13**	**18**	22	40	11	**5.5**	0	0	0	0	0	0	0	**2**
2019	Texas A&M	12	**18**	**27**	**45**	**12**	**5.5**	0	0	0	0	**1**	**18**	0	**2**
Career		38	43	62	105	26	11.0	0	0	0	0	1	18	0	4

== Personal life ==
Madubuike went by his English first name Justin, which is written on his birth certificate, from elementary school until 2024. During the 2024 offseason, he opted to switch to his Nigerian name Nnamdi in recognition of his heritage.
