= Wekiva High School =

Public high school in Apopka, Florida, United States

Location
- 2501 N. Hiawassee Road; Apopka, Florida, 32703; United States
- 28.638114°N 81.47378°W

Information
- Type: Public secondary
- Motto: Prepare for Greatness
- Established: 2007
- School district: Orange County Public Schools
- NCES District ID: 1201440
- CEEB code: 100035
- NCES School ID: 120144005017
- Principal: Anthony Russell
- Teaching staff: 93.00 (on an FTE basis)
- Grades: 9–12
- Enrollment: 2,184 (2023–2024)
- Student to teacher ratio: 23.48
- Colors: Maroon, Navy, and Gold
- Mascot: Mustang
- Newspaper: The Mustang Times
- Yearbook: Marshtackie
- Website: wekivahs.ocps.net

Wekiva High School is a public secondary school located in Apopka, Florida. It was first established in 2007 as a relief school for Apopka High School and Ocoee High School. Since July 2025, Wekiva's principal is Anthony Russell.

== Programs ==
In addition to typical academic, athletic programs offered by public high schools in Orange County, Wekiva High has a JROTC program, advanced studies program, and two magnet programs.

=== JROTC ===
Wekiva High School's Inaugural AFJROTC cadet program competed at the 22nd Annual First Coast AFJROTC Invitational Drill Competition on January 16, 2010, at NB Forrest High School in Jacksonville, FL.

=== Cambridge AICE Diploma Program ===
Wekiva is one of nine Orange County Public Schools to offer the AICE Diploma.

=== Wekiva Culinary ===
Wekiva offers a culinary magnet program that accredits students toward Certified Food Safety Manager, Food Protection Manager (ServSafe®), and National ProStart Certificate of Achievement.

=== Agriscience Academy ===
Wekiva offers an Agriscience Academy––a program that focuses on aquaponics, biotechnology, animal science, agribusiness, and horticulture. The curriculum offers dual enrollment, animal husbandry, and industry certification curricula.

== Notable people ==
=== Alumni ===
- Tyler Davis, football player for Los Angeles Rams
- Logan Gilbert, baseball player for Seattle Mariners
- Renardo Green, football player for San Francisco 49ers
- Tashawn Manning, football player for Baltimore Ravens
- Paul Reed, basketball player for Detroit Pistons
- Sean Murphy, Water Polo player for University of Florida
