= Zay Flowers =

American football player (born 2000)

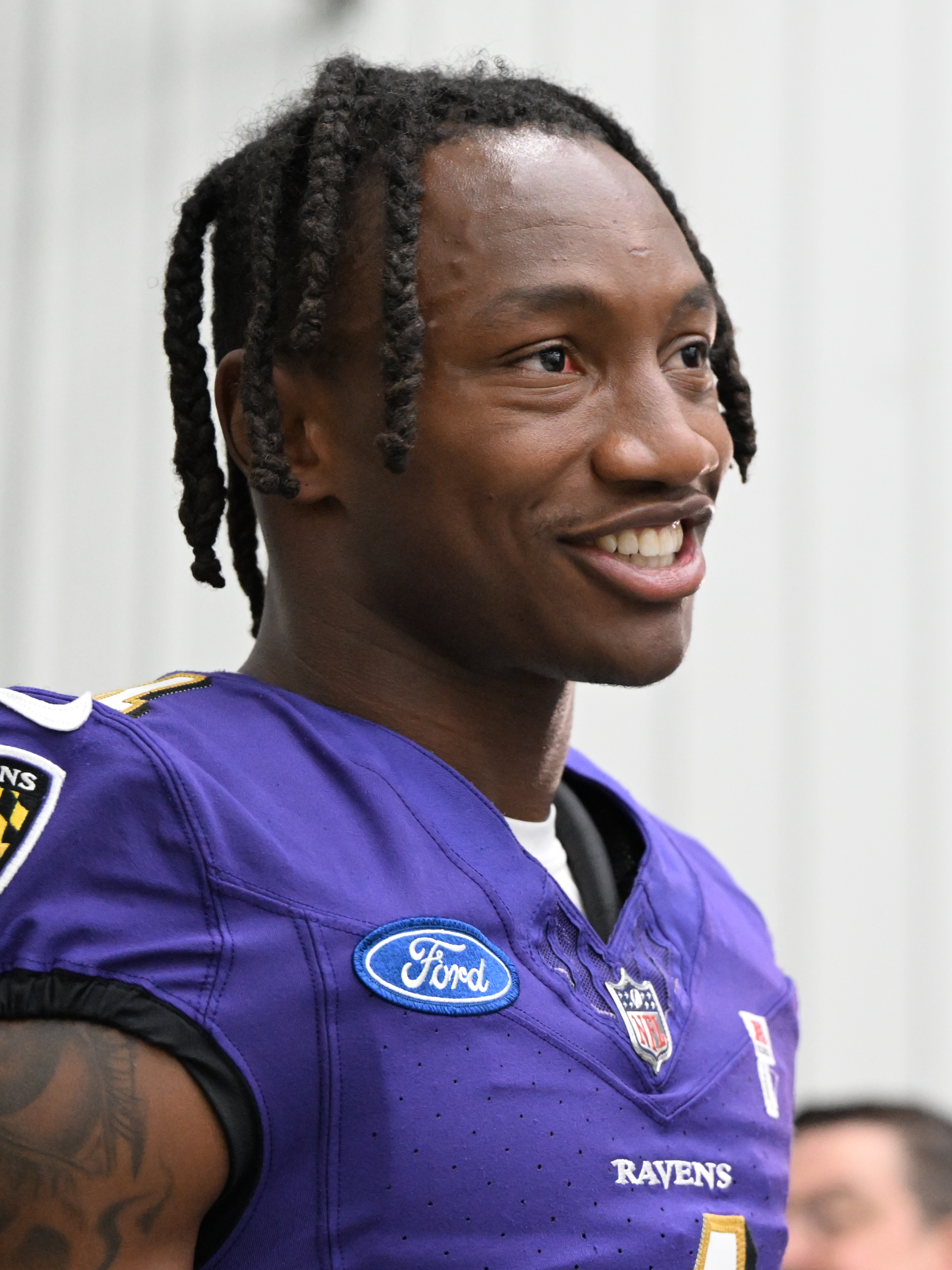
- Flowers with the Baltimore Ravens in 2024

No. 4 – Baltimore Ravens
- Position: Wide receiver
- Roster status: Active

Personal information
- Born: September 11, 2000 (age 26); Fort Lauderdale, Florida, U.S.
- Listed height: 5 ft 9 in (1.75 m)
- Listed weight: 183 lb (83 kg)

Career information
- High school: NSU University School (Davie, Florida)
- College: Boston College (2019–2022)
- NFL draft: 2023: 1st round, 22nd overall pick

Career history
- Baltimore Ravens (2023–present)

Awards and highlights
- 2× Pro Bowl (2024, 2025); Third-team All-American (2022); 2× First-team All-ACC (2020, 2022); Third-team All-ACC (2021)

Career NFL statistics as of Week 10, 2026
- Receptions: 286
- Receiving yards: 3,816
- Receiving touchdowns: 17
- Stats at Pro Football Reference

Xavien "Zay" Kevonn Flowers (born September 11, 2000) is an American professional football wide receiver for the Baltimore Ravens of the National Football League (NFL). He played college football for the Boston College Eagles and was selected by the Ravens in the first round of the 2023 NFL draft.

== Early life ==
Flowers was born to Willie Flowers and Jackie Walden on September 11, 2000. When Flowers was five years old, his mother died from a head injury. The 11th of 14 children, Flowers grew up in Fort Lauderdale, Florida, and attended NSU University School. While Flowers was in high school, his brother, Martin, was murdered. As a junior, he caught 48 passes for 631 yards and 10 touchdowns. While at NSU, Flowers played wide receiver and cornerback, helping the team to back to back state semifinal appearances. As a 3-star prospect, he ranked as the nation's 135th receiver recruit and committed to play college football at Boston College.

== College career ==
As a true freshman, Flowers caught 22 passes for 341 yards and three touchdowns. After Boston College closed their campus in March 2020 due to COVID-19, he returned to Florida and worked out on occasion with NFL players Antonio Brown and Geno Smith. Flowers became the second wide receiver in school history to be named first team All-Atlantic Coast Conference after finishing his sophomore season with 56 receptions for 892 yards and nine touchdowns. He was named third-team All-ACC after catching 44 passes for 746 yards and five touchdowns. During his career at Boston College, Flowers broke numerous records, including first in career touchdowns, receptions, and receiving yards. On December 1, 2022, Flowers declared for the 2023 NFL draft. On May 18, 2026, Zay Flowers graduated from Boston College with a bachelor's degree in communications, becoming the first in his family to earn a college degree.

== Professional career ==
Pre-draft measurables
Height	Weight	Arm length	Hand span	Wingspan	40-yard dash	10-yard split	20-yard split	Vertical jump	Broad jump
5 ft 9 1/4 in (1.76 m)	182 lb (83 kg)	29 1/4 in (0.74 m)	9 1/4 in (0.23 m)	6 ft 0 1/4 in (1.84 m)	4.42 s	1.53 s	2.53 s	35.5 in (0.90 m)	10 ft 7 in (3.23 m)
All values from the NFL Combine

=== 2023 ===
Flowers was selected by the Baltimore Ravens as the 22nd overall pick in the 2023 NFL draft. On June 15, Flowers signed a 4-year, $14 million fully guaranteed rookie contract. In Week 1 against the Houston Texans, he led the team with nine catches for 78 yards in 25–9 win. He also had two carries for nine yards. In week 6, in the game in London, Flowers scored his first NFL touchdown against the Tennessee Titans in the Ravens' 24–16 victory. In Week 12, Flowers scored two touchdowns, a 3-yard reception and 37-yard run, in the Ravens' 20–10 win against the Los Angeles Chargers. He finished the game with 62 total yards. In Week 17, after scoring a 75-yard touchdown against the Miami Dolphins, Flowers set a Ravens franchise record for most receptions (77) and receiving yards (858) by a rookie.

In the fourth quarter of the AFC Championship Game against the Kansas City Chiefs, Flowers fumbled at the goal line and the Chiefs recovered the ball in the end zone for a touchback. This occurred after getting a 15-yard taunting penalty earlier in the drive. Flowers finished the game with five receptions for 115 yards and a touchdown as the Ravens lost 10–17.

=== 2024 ===
In Week 2 against the Las Vegas Raiders, Flowers had 7 catches for 91 yards and a touchdown in the 26–23 loss. In Week 5 against the Cincinnati Bengals, Flowers led the Ravens with 7 catches for 111 yards in the 41–38 comeback overtime win. It was his first 100-yard game of the season and the second of his career. The following week against the Washington Commanders, Flowers exploded for career-highs of 132 receiving yards on 9 catches, all of them in the first half as the Ravens won 30–23. This marked the first time Flowers has exceeded the 100-yard mark in back-to-back games. In Week 8 against the Cleveland Browns, Flowers recorded his third 100-yard game when he caught 7 passes for 115 yards in the 24–29 upset loss. The following game against the Denver Broncos, Flowers recorded five catches for 127 yards and two touchdowns including a touchdown that went for 53 yards in the Ravens' 41–10 blowout win.

In Week 16 against the Pittsburgh Steelers, Flowers had 5 catches for 100 yards as the Ravens would go on to beat the Steelers 34–17. In the fourth quarter, Flowers caught a 49-yard reception, moving him past 1000 receiving yards for the season. On January 2, 2025, it was announced that Flowers was selected to his first Pro Bowl, becoming the first wide receiver to be selected to a Pro Bowl as a wide receiver in the Ravens' franchise history. Prior to this, other Ravens receivers had been selected as return specialists.

During the 2024 season Flowers recorded 82 receptions for 1,050 yards and 8 touchdowns, becoming the Ravens' leading wide receiver.

=== 2025 ===
In his season debut, Flowers recorded 7 receptions on 9 targets for a career-high 143 receiving yards as well as a touchdown; he also rushed the ball twice for 8 yards. Despite his positive showing, the Ravens lost 40–41 to the Buffalo Bills after blowing a fourth-quarter lead. In Week 2, Flowers had seven receptions for 75 yards in a 41–17 win over the Cleveland Browns. He also added four yards on the ground via a rush. In a Week 3 loss to the Detroit Lions, Flowers disappointed with two receptions for a season-low of 13 yards. During another loss in Week 4 to the Kansas City Chiefs, he had seven receptions for 74 yards. In Week 5, with starting quarterback Lamar Jackson injured, Flowers had five catches for 72 yards, as the Ravens would lose to the Houston Texans, 44–10. During a Week 6 matchup against the Los Angeles Rams, Flowers had six catches for 46 yards, but was involved in two lost fumbles. Against the Chicago Bears in Week 7, Flowers rushed once for eight yards, while adding 63 receiving yards on seven catches. During the team's Week 8 matchup against the Miami Dolphins, Jackson returned, allowing Flowers to have 64 yards on five catches. Flowers was selected to his second consecutive Pro Bowl in December 2025. In Week 18 against the Pittsburgh Steelers, he recorded four receptions for 138 yards and two touchdowns.

=== 2026 ===
Flowers runs out of the tunnel before the Ravens' 2026 game against the Jacksonville Jaguars

On April 23, 2026, the Ravens picked up Flowers' fifth-year option worth $28 million, keeping him under contract through the 2027 season. On August 4, the Ravens signed Flowers to a four-year, $140 million contract extension. In Week 1 of the 2026 season against the Indianapolis Colts, Flowers pulled in 5 receptions for 150 yards and a touchdown, despite exiting the game after halftime due to a hamstring injury.

In a Week 10 game against the Los Angeles Chargers, Flowers fumbled after a first-down catch with about two minutes remaining and the Ravens trailing 23–20. The Chargers recovered the ball and went on to win their first game of the season.

== Career statistics ==
=== NFL ===
Legend
**Bold**	Career high

==== Regular season ====
Year	Team	Games		Receiving					Rushing					Fumbles	
Year	Team	GP	GS	Rec	Yds	Avg	Lng	TD	Att	Yds	Avg	Lng	TD	Fum	Lost
2023	BAL	16	16	77	858	11.1	**75T**	**5**	8	56	**7.0**	**37T**	**1**	0	0
2024	BAL	**17**	15	74	1,059	**14.3**	53	4	9	56	6.2	19	0	0	0
2025	BAL	**17**	**17**	**86**	**1,211**	14.1	64	**5**	**10**	**62**	6.2	18	**1**	**3**	**3**
2026	BAL	9	7	49	688	14.0	54	3	6	51	8.5	20	0	1	1
Career		59	55	286	3,816	13.3	75	17	33	225	6.8	37	2	4	4

==== Postseason ====
Year	Team	Games		Receiving					Rushing					Fumbles	
Year	Team	GP	GS	Rec	Yds	Avg	Lng	TD	Att	Yds	Avg	Lng	TD	Fum	Lost
2023	BAL	2	2	9	156	17.3	54	1	2	4	2.0	3	0	1	1
2024	BAL	0	0	Did not play due to injury											
Career		2	2	9	156	17.3	54	1	2	4	2.0	3	0	1	1

=== College ===
Legend
**Bold**	Career high

Season	Team	Games		Receiving				Rushing			
Season	Team	GP	GS	Rec	Yards	Avg	TD	Att	Yards	Avg	TD
2019	Boston College	**13**	**13**	22	341	15.5	3	**27**	**195**	7.2	**1**
2020	Boston College	11	11	56	892	15.9	9	11	41	3.7	**1**
2021	Boston College	12	12	44	746	**17.0**	5	7	69	**9.9**	0
2022	Boston College	12	12	**78**	**1,077**	13.8	**12**	12	40	3.3	0
Career		48	48	200	3,056	15.3	29	57	345	6.1	2

== Career highlights ==
=== Ravens franchise records ===
- Most receiving yards by a wide receiver in rookie season: 858 (2023)
- Most receptions by a wide receiver in rookie season: 77 (2023)
