= Keaton Mitchell =

American football player (born 2002)

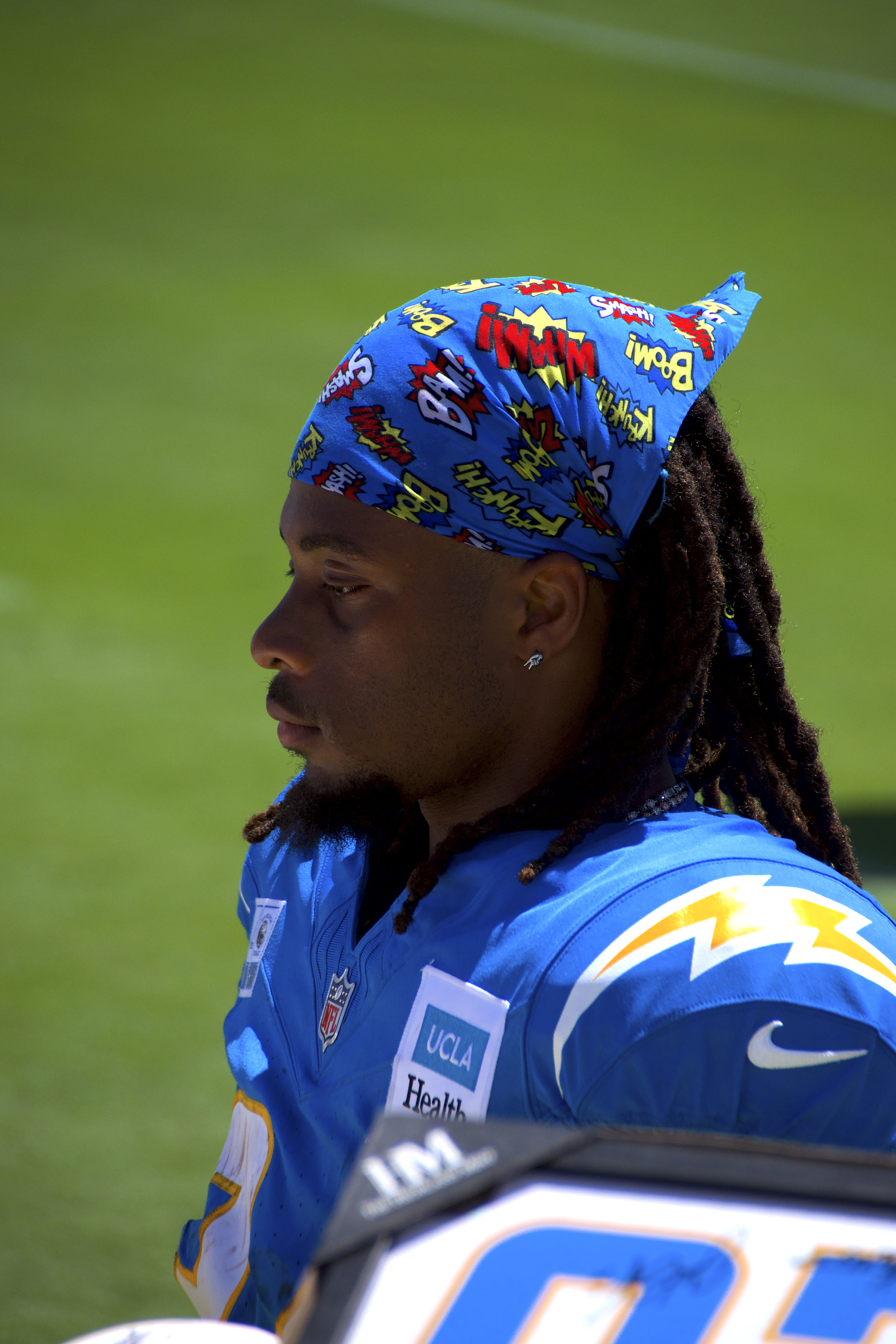
- Mitchell with the Los Angeles Chargers in 2026

No. 34 – Los Angeles Chargers
- Position: Running back
- Roster status: Active

Personal information
- Born: January 17, 2002 (age 24); McDonough, Georgia, U.S.
- Listed height: 5 ft 8 in (1.73 m)
- Listed weight: 191 lb (87 kg)

Career information
- High school: Eagle's Landing Christian (McDonough, Georgia)
- College: East Carolina (2020–2022)
- NFL draft: 2023: undrafted

Career history
- Baltimore Ravens (2023–2025); Los Angeles Chargers (2026–present)

Awards and highlights
- 2× First-team All-AAC (2021, 2022)

Career NFL statistics as of Week 10, 2026
- Rushing yards: 949
- Rushing average: 5.6
- Rushing touchdowns: 3
- Receptions: 37
- Receiving yards: 287
- Receiving touchdowns: 1
- Return yards: 1,146
- Stats at Pro Football Reference

Keaton Anthony Mitchell (born January 17, 2002) is an American professional football running back for the Los Angeles Chargers of the National Football League (NFL). He played college football for the East Carolina Pirates and was signed as an undrafted free agent by the Baltimore Ravens after the 2023 NFL draft.

== Early life ==
Mitchell was born on January 17, 2002, in McDonough, Georgia. He is the son of Anthony Mitchell, who played several years in the National Football League (NFL) and won a Super Bowl with the Baltimore Ravens, and Kandice Mitchell, who played for the United States women's national American football team during the 2017 IFAF Women's World Championship. He attended Eagle's Landing Christian Academy and helped them reach four consecutive state championships, running for a total of 4,347 yards and 88 touchdowns just during his junior and senior years combined, as they won 54 of 56 games. He was a Class A Private Offensive Player of the Year and Class A Region 5 Player of the Year honoree, committing to play college football at East Carolina (ECU) after his graduation.

== College career ==
As a true freshman at East Carolina in 2020, Mitchell appeared in nine games while starting two, and posted 88 rush attempts for 443 yards and two touchdowns, as well as 11 receptions for 75 yards and one touchdown. In 2021, he started all 12 games and recorded over 1,000 rushing yards, becoming the first to do so at ECU since Tay Cooper in 2013. He was a first-team all-conference choice and led the American Athletic Conference (AAC) in both total rushing yards (1,132) and all-purpose yards per game (115.83), while additionally placing high in the conference leaderboards in four other statistics. He posted a total of four 100-yard rushing games that season, including a 222-yard performance against Tulane which was the best all-time for an ECU freshman.

As a sophomore in 2022, Mitchell ran for 1,452 yards and scored 14 touchdowns, while being the national FBS leader in runs of more than 10 yards, with 54. He ran for over 100 yards in nine out of their 12 games, additionally tallying 27 catches for 252 yards and one score. He was named an honorable mention All-American by Pro Football Focus (PFF) and was first-team All-AAC for the second straight year. Mitchell declared for the NFL draft after the season, and finished his stint at East Carolina with 3,027 rushing yards and an average of 6.5 yards-per-carry.

== Professional career ==
Pre-draft measurables
Height	Weight	Arm length	Hand span	Wingspan	40-yard dash	10-yard split	20-yard split	20-yard shuttle	Three-cone drill	Vertical jump	Broad jump	Bench press
5 ft 7 7/8 in (1.72 m)	179 lb (81 kg)	30 3/4 in (0.78 m)	9 1/4 in (0.23 m)	6 ft 2 3/4 in (1.90 m)	4.37 s	1.48 s	2.52 s	4.36 s	7.40 s	38.0 in (0.97 m)	10 ft 6 in (3.20 m)	13 reps
All values from NFL Combine/Pro Day

=== Baltimore Ravens ===
Mitchell was projected to be selected in the 2023 NFL draft. On May 5, 2023, Mitchell was signed by the Baltimore Ravens as an undrafted free agent. Pro Football Focus considered Mitchell to be one of the ten best undrafted free agent signings from the 2023 NFL Draft class. On August 29, the Ravens announced that Mitchell had made the initial 53-man roster, but he was placed on injured reserve two days later.

Mitchell was activated off of injured reserve on October 14, and made his NFL debut the next day against the Tennessee Titans in Week 6, playing exclusively on the special teams in the 24–16 win. In Week 9, he ran for 138 yards on nine carries and scored his first NFL rushing touchdown (he also recorded a -4 yard reception) in a 37–3 rout of the Seattle Seahawks. His performance earned him the FedEx Ground Player of Week Award.

During the Week 15 23–7 win over the Jacksonville Jaguars, Mitchell injured his knee in the fourth quarter after being tackled by Jaguars' safety Andrew Wingard. Mitchell was immediately ruled out and carted back to the locker room for further evaluation. After the game, it was announced he fully tore his ACL and would miss the rest of the season. He was placed on injured reserve on December 19. He finished his rookie season with 47 carries for 396 rushing yards and two rushing touchdowns in eight games and two starts.

On July 15, 2024, Mitchell was placed on the Physically Unable to Perform (PUP) list. He was activated for Week 10.

=== Los Angeles Chargers ===
On March 13, 2026, Mitchell signed a two-year, $9.25 million contract with the Los Angeles Chargers.

== NFL career statistics ==
Legend
**Bold**	Career high

=== Regular season ===
Year	Team	Games		Rushing					Receiving					Kickoff returns					Fumbles	
Year	Team	GP	GS	Att	Yds	Avg	Lng	TD	Rec	Yds	Avg	Lng	TD	Ret	Yds	Avg	Lng	TD	Fum	Lost
2023	BAL	8	2	47	**396**	**8.4**	**60**	**2**	**9**	**93**	10.3	**32**	0	–	–	–	–	–	0	0
2024	BAL	5	0	15	30	2.0	7	0	1	28	**28.0**	28	0	5	156	**31.2**	**47**	0	0	0
2025	BAL	13	0	**59**	341	5.8	55	1	**9**	63	7.0	17	0	**22**	**591**	26.9	41	0	**1**	0
2026	LAC	9	1	49	182	3.7	20	0	18	103	5.7	15	1	18	399	22.2	28	0	1	0
Career		35	3	170	949	5.6	60	3	37	287	7.8	32	1	45	1,146	25.5	47	0	2	0

=== Postseason ===
Year	Team	Games		Rushing					Receiving					Kickoff returns					Fumbles	
Year	Team	GP	GS	Att	Yds	Avg	Lng	TD	Rec	Yds	Avg	Lng	TD	Ret	Yds	Avg	Lng	TD	Fum	Lost
2023	BAL	0	0	Did not play due to injury																
2024	BAL	2	0	0	0	0.0	0	0	0	0	0.0	0	0	5	134	26.8	32	0	0	0
Career		2	0	0	0	0.0	0	0	0	0	0.0	0	0	5	134	26.8	32	0	0	0
