= Gus Edwards (American football) =

Liberian gridiron football player (born 1995)

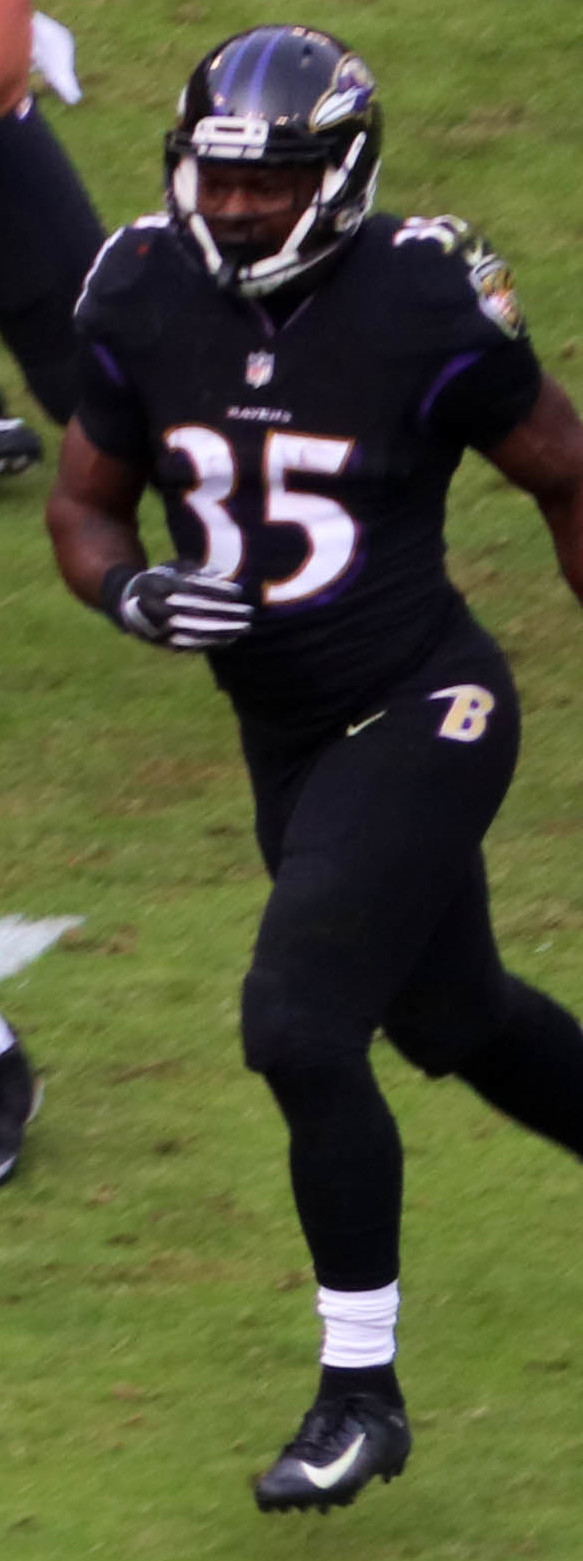
- Edwards with the Baltimore Ravens in 2018

Profile
- Position: Running back

Personal information
- Born: 13 April 1995 (age 31); Monrovia, Liberia
- Listed height: 6 ft 1 in (1.85 m)
- Listed weight: 238 lb (108 kg)

Career information
- High school: Tottenville (Staten Island, New York, U.S.)
- College: Miami (2013–2016); Rutgers (2017)
- NFL draft: 2018: undrafted

Career history
- Baltimore Ravens (2018–2023); Los Angeles Chargers (2024)

Career NFL statistics as of 2024
- Rushing yards: 3,760
- Rushing average: 4.7
- Rushing touchdowns: 30
- Receptions: 33
- Receiving yards: 380
- Stats at Pro Football Reference

Augustus Edwards (born April 13, 1995) is a Liberian professional football running back. He played college football for the Miami Hurricanes before transferring to the Rutgers Scarlet Knights and signing with the Baltimore Ravens as an undrafted free agent in 2018. Edwards's nickname is "Gus the Bus"; being known for his large size and "physical" run style.

== Early life ==
Edwards was born in Liberia during the First Liberian Civil War, which tore the country apart and killed many civilians. Gus moved to the United States at the age of five along with his family. He attended and played high school football at Tottenville High School.

Edwards was named as a three-star recruit by ESPN, 247Sports.com, Rivals.com, and Scout.com. After initially verbally committing to Syracuse, a coaching change caused him to rescind his commitment and reopen his recruitment. He eventually committed to Miami to play college football.

== College career ==
Edwards played college football at the University of Miami from 2013–2016 and for the Rutgers Scarlet Knights in 2017 as a graduate transfer.

=== College statistics ===
Gus Edwards						Rushing				Receiving			
Year	School	Conf	Class	Pos	G	Att	Yds	Avg	TD	Rec	Yds	Avg	TD
2013	Miami (FL)	ACC	FR	RB	9	66	338	5.1	5	0	0	0	0
2014	Miami (FL)	ACC	SO	RB	10	61	349	5.7	6	2	44	22.0	0
2015	Miami (FL)	ACC	JR	RB	Did not play due to injury								
2016	Miami (FL)	ACC	SR	RB	10	59	290	4.9	1	1	9	9.0	0
2017	Rutgers	Big Ten	SR	RB	12	164	713	4.3	6	13	103	7.9	1
Career	Overall					350	1,690	4.8	18	16	156	9.8	1

== Professional career ==
Pre-draft measurables
Height	Weight	Arm length	Hand span	40-yard dash	10-yard split	20-yard split	20-yard shuttle	Three-cone drill	Vertical jump	Broad jump	Bench press
6 ft 1 in (1.85 m)	229 lb (104 kg)	32 5/8 in (0.83 m)	9 1/8 in (0.23 m)	4.52 s	1.65 s	2.56 s	4.24 s	7.22 s	34.5 in (0.88 m)	10 ft 3 in (3.12 m)	17 reps
All values from Pro Day

=== Baltimore Ravens ===
==== 2018 ====
Edwards signed with the Baltimore Ravens as an undrafted free agent on 4 May 2018. He was waived on 1 September 2018 and was signed to the practice squad the next day. He was promoted to the active roster on 13 October 2018. In Week 6 of the 2018 season, he made his professional debut in the 21–0 victory over the Tennessee Titans. He had 10 carries for 42 yards in the game. In a Week 11 victory over the Cincinnati Bengals, he recorded 17 carries for 115 yards and a touchdown.

Edwards joined elite company on 25 November 2018, when he recorded 23 carries for 118 yards in a 34–17 victory over the Oakland Raiders. He became the first Ravens' rookie running back to have back to back 100+ yard rushing games since Jamal Lewis in the 2000 season. He finished the season as the Ravens leading rusher with 718 rushing yards and two touchdowns. He finished fifth among all rookie running backs in rushing yards. In the Wild Card Round against the Los Angeles Chargers, he had 23 rushing yards in his playoff debut, a 23–17 loss.

==== 2019 ====
In Week 11 against the Houston Texans, Edwards rushed eight times for 112 yards and a touchdown in the 41–7 win. In Week 17 against the Pittsburgh Steelers, Edwards rushed 21 times for 130 yards during the 28–10 win. In the 2019 season, Edwards finished with 133 carries for 711 rushing yards and two rushing touchdowns.

==== 2020 ====
Edwards signed a one-year exclusive-rights free agent tender with the Ravens on 28 July 2020.

In Week 13 against the Dallas Cowboys, Edwards rushed for 101 yards on seven carries during the 34–17 win. In Week 14, against the Cleveland Browns, he had seven carries for 49 rushing yards and two rushing touchdowns in the 47–42 victory. In the 2020 season, Edwards played in all 16 games, of which he started six. He finished with 144 carries for 723 rushing yards and six rushing touchdowns to go along with nine receptions for 129 receiving yards.

==== 2021 ====
The Ravens placed a second-round restricted free agent tender on Edwards on 10 March 2021. He signed a two-year contract extension with the team worth $10 million on 7 June. On 9 September 2021, Edwards suffered a torn ACL during practice ending his season. He was put on injured reserve the following day.

==== 2022 ====
Edwards was placed on the reserve/PUP list to start the season on 23 August 2022. He was activated on 22 October. In his first game back, he scored two rushing touchdowns against the Browns in the 23–20 victory in Week 7. In the 2022 regular season, Edwards played in nine games and started four. He finished with 87 carries for 433 rushing yards and three rushing touchdowns.

==== 2023 ====
Edwards started the year second on the depth chart behind J. K. Dobbins, but was swiftly made the lead back after Dobbins tore his Achilles in Week 1's 25–9 win over the Houston Texans. Edwards was used mostly in short yardage and goal-line situation but had numerous career highs by the end of the season. In Week 7 against the Detroit Lions, Edwards had a career-long 80-yard reception (which also gave him a career-high in receiving yards) along with 14 carries for 64 yards and a touchdown in a 38–6 blowout win. His best game came in Week 8, where he had 19 carries for 80 yards and a career-high three touchdowns along with two receptions for 14 yards in a 31–24 win over the Arizona Cardinals. In the next week, Edwards had five carries for 52 yards and two touchdowns in 37–3 rout of the Seattle Seahawks. In Week 11 against the Cincinnati Bengals, Edwards had 12 carries for 62 yards and two touchdowns along with two receptions for 8 yards in a 34–20 win. In Week 17 against the Miami Dolphins, Edwards's rushed for 68 yards and a touchdown on 16 carries in a 56-19 blowout win.

Edwards finished the season with career-highs in carries (198), rushing yards (810), rushing touchdowns (13), receptions (12), and receiving yards (180). His 13 rushing touchdowns was the fifth highest of any player that season.

=== Los Angeles Chargers ===
On March 13, 2024, Edwards signed a two-year contract with the Los Angeles Chargers. He entered Week 1 as the starting running back and was splitting time with J. K. Dobbins, but lost the starting role as Dobbins emerged. He was placed on injured reserve on October 12 with an ankle injury. He was activated ahead of Week 10's matchup against Tennessee Titans on November 9. He was released on March 10, 2025.

== NFL career statistics ==
Legend
**Bold**	Career high

Regular season
Year	Team	Games		Rushing					Receiving					Fumbles	
Year	Team	GP	GS	Att	Yds	Avg	Lng	TD	Rec	Yds	Avg	Lng	TD	Fum	Lost
2018	BAL	11	6	137	718	5.2	43	2	2	20	10.0	13	0	0	0
2019	BAL	16	1	133	711	**5.3**	**63T**	2	7	45	6.4	10	0	2	1
2020	BAL	16	6	144	723	5.0	36	6	9	129	14.3	34	0	1	1
2021	BAL	Did not play due to injury													
2022	BAL	9	4	87	433	5.0	37	3	0	0	0.0	0	0	1	1
2023	BAL	17	9	**198**	**810**	4.1	42	**13**	**12**	**180**	**15.0**	**80**	0	**3**	**2**
2024	LAC	11	6	101	365	3.6	43	4	3	6	2.0	3	0	0	0
Career		80	32	800	3,760	4.7	63	30	33	380	11.5	80	0	7	5

Postseason
Year	Team	Games		Rushing					Receiving					Fumbles	
Year	Team	GP	GS	Att	Yds	Avg	Lng	TD	Rec	Yds	Avg	Lng	TD	Fum	Lost
2018	BAL	1	1	8	23	2.9	5	0	0	0	0.0	0	0	0	0
2019	BAL	1	0	3	20	**6.7**	**19**	0	0	0	0.0	0	0	0	0
2020	BAL	2	1	**18**	**80**	4.4	12	0	0	0	0.0	0	0	**1**	0
2022	BAL	1	0	12	39	3.3	9	0	1	13	**13.0**	13	0	0	0
2023	BAL	2	0	13	60	4.6	15	0	**2**	**15**	7.5	**16**	0	0	0
2024	LAC	1	0	7	22	3.1	8	0	0	0	0.0	0	0	0	0
Career		8	2	61	244	4.0	19	0	3	28	9.3	16	0	1	0
