= Tykeem Doss =

American football player (born 1999)

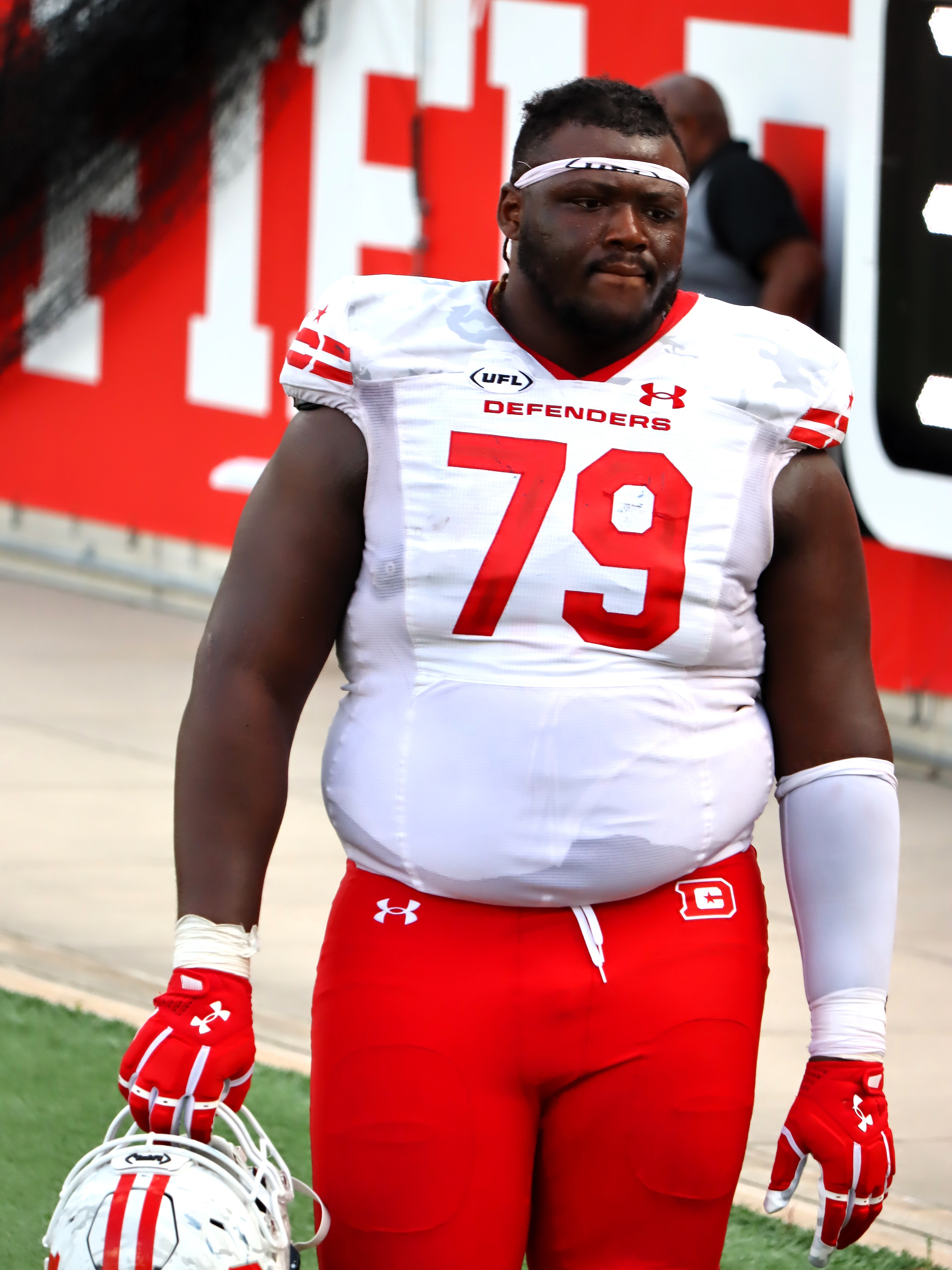
- Doss with the DC Defenders in 2025

No. 79 – DC Defenders
- Position: Guard
- Roster status: Active

Personal information
- Born: September 25, 1999 (age 27); Aliceville, Alabama, U.S.
- Listed height: 6 ft 5 in (1.96 m)
- Listed weight: 369 lb (167 kg)

Career information
- High school: Aliceville
- College: East Central CC (2018–2019); Southern Miss (2020–2022)
- NFL draft: 2023: undrafted

Career history
- Baltimore Ravens (2023–2024)*; Pittsburgh Steelers (2024)*; DC Defenders (2025–present)
- * Offseason or practice squad member only

Awards and highlights
- UFL champion (2025)
- Stats at Pro Football Reference

Tykeem Doss (born September 25, 1999) is an American professional football guard for the DC Defenders of the United Football League (UFL). He played college football for the Southern Miss Golden Eagles.

== Early life ==
Doss grew up in Aliceville, Alabama and attended Aliceville High School where he played football, basketball and track. In his high school football career, he played a total of 37 games, registered 82 tackles, two sacks and one interception. He was selected for the Scout Trout All-American events in Mobile, Alabama during his senior season.

== College career ==
=== East Central CC ===
On May 10, 2018, Doss signed to play at East Central CC. During his sophomore season, he was named the Most Valuable Offensive Lineman and Mississippi Association of Community and Junior Colleges First-Team All-Conference South Offense. He was also named to the NJCAA All-Region 23 football team. On December 18, 2019, Doss signed to play for the Southern Miss Golden Eagles.

=== Southern Miss ===
During the 2020 season, Doss played 9 games and started the last 6 of them while at left guard. During the 2021 season, he played 8 games while on offense and started 3 while on left tackle. During the 2022 season, he played 11 games and made 3 total tackles.

== Professional career ==
Pre-draft measurables
| Height | Weight | Arm length | Hand span | Wingspan | 40-yard dash | 10-yard split | 20-yard split | 20-yard shuttle | Three-cone drill | Vertical jump | Broad jump | Bench press |
|---|---|---|---|---|---|---|---|---|---|---|---|---|
| 6 ft 5 in (1.96 m) | 378 lb (171 kg) | 35 in (0.89 m) | 10 1/8 in (0.26 m) | 7 ft 1 1/2 in (2.17 m) | 5.54 s | 1.89 s | 3.14 s | 5.13 s | 8.19 s | 24 in (0.61 m) | 8 ft 3 in (2.51 m) | 28 reps |
All values from Pro Day

=== Baltimore Ravens ===
Doss was signed by the Baltimore Ravens as an undrafted free agent on May 5, 2023. He was waived on August 29, but was signed to the practice squad the next day. He signed a reserve/future contract on January 29, 2024.

On August 11, 2024, Doss was released by the Ravens.

=== Pittsburgh Steelers ===
On August 12, 2024, Doss was claimed off waivers by the Pittsburgh Steelers. He was waived on August 27.

=== DC Defenders ===
On November 2, 2024, Doss signed with the DC Defenders of the United Football League (UFL).
