= Tashawn Manning =

American football player (born 2000)

Profile
- Position: Guard

Personal information
- Born: May 23, 1998 (age 28); Apopka, Florida, U.S.
- Listed height: 6 ft 3 in (1.91 m)
- Listed weight: 340 lb (154 kg)

Career information
- High school: Wekiva (Apopka)
- College: Auburn (2016–2021); Kentucky (2022)
- NFL draft: 2023: undrafted

Career history
- Baltimore Ravens (2023)*; Cincinnati Bengals (2024)*
- * Offseason or practice squad member only
- Stats at Pro Football Reference

Tashawn Manning (born May 23, 1998) is an American professional football guard. He played college football for the Auburn Tigers and Kentucky Wildcats, and was signed by the Baltimore Ravens as an undrafted free agent in 2023.

== College career ==
Manning was recruited by the Auburn where he played five years, as he redshirted his freshman year. He eventually decided to transfer in late 2021. He committed to Kentucky on December 14, 2021. He had a successful campaign with Kentucky, getting selected to play in the NFLPA Collegiate Bowl.

== Professional career ==
Pre-draft measurables
Height	Weight	Arm length	Hand span	40-yard dash	10-yard split	20-yard split	20-yard shuttle	Three-cone drill	Vertical jump	Broad jump
6 ft 3 1/8 in (1.91 m)	327 lb (148 kg)	34 1/2 in (0.88 m)	9 3/4 in (0.25 m)	5.34 s	1.85 s	3.08 s	4.80 s	7.90 s	27.5 in (0.70 m)	8 ft 6 in (2.59 m)
All values from NFL Combine

=== Baltimore Ravens ===
Manning was not selected during the 2023 NFL draft. After the conclusion of the draft, he was signed by the Baltimore Ravens as an undrafted free agent. Prior to the beginning of the regular season, he was waived and then re-signed to the team's practice squad. He signed a reserve/future contract on January 29, 2024. He was waived on August 27.

=== Cincinnati Bengals ===
On August 29, 2024, Manning was signed to the Cincinnati Bengals practice squad. He signed a reserve/future contract with Cincinnati on January 7, 2025. On July 20, Manning was waived by the Bengals.
