= Travis Jones (defensive lineman) =

American football player (born 1999)

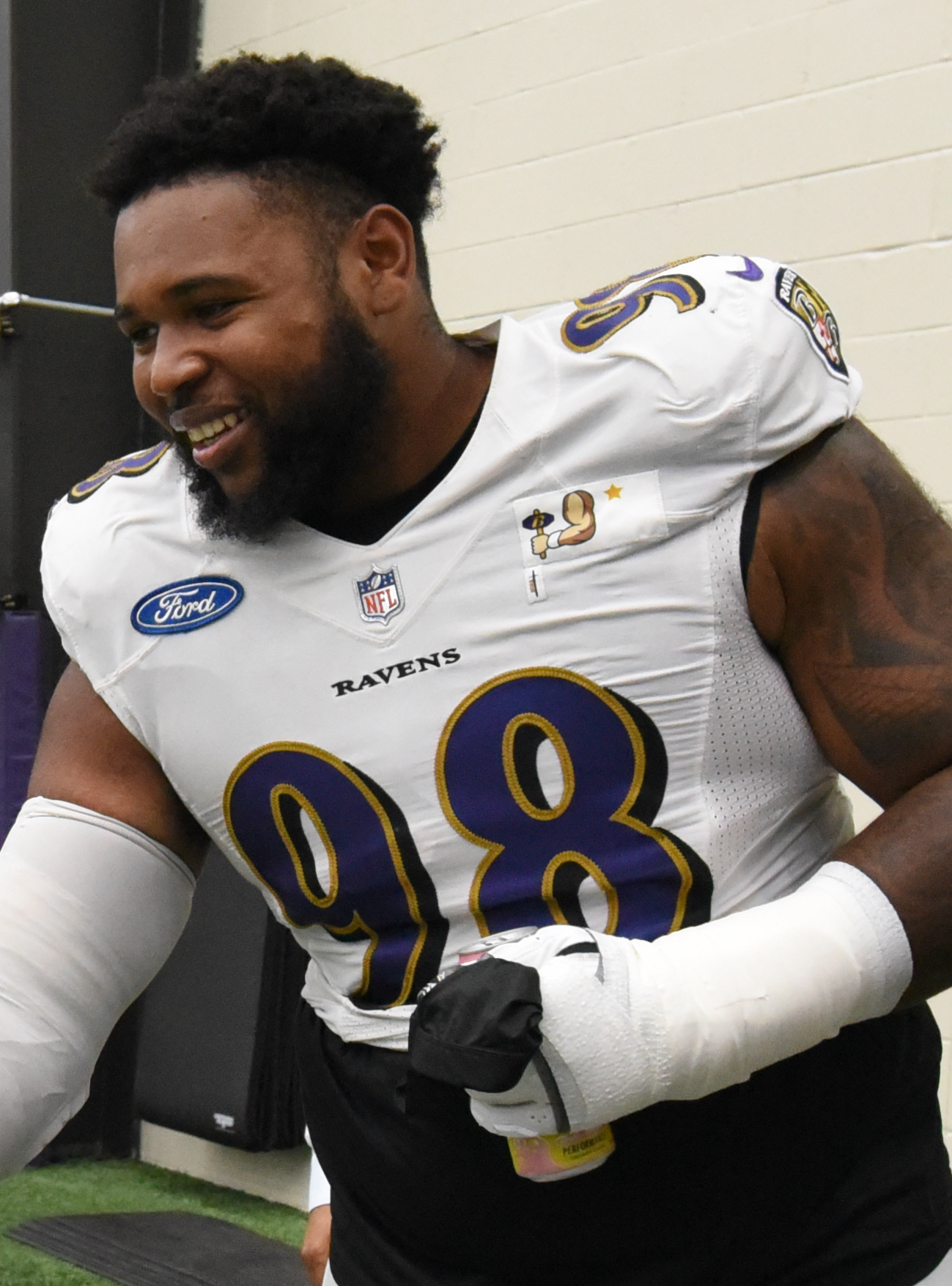
- Jones with the Baltimore Ravens in 2023

No. 98 – Baltimore Ravens
- Position: Nose tackle
- Roster status: Active

Personal information
- Born: October 15, 1999 (age 27); New Haven, Connecticut, U.S.
- Listed height: 6 ft 4 in (1.93 m)
- Listed weight: 338 lb (153 kg)

Career information
- High school: Wilbur Cross (New Haven)
- College: UConn (2018–2021)
- NFL draft: 2022: 3rd round, 76th overall pick

Career history
- Baltimore Ravens (2022–present)

Career NFL statistics as of 2025
- Total tackles: 149
- Sacks: 8.5
- Forced fumbles: 1
- Fumble recoveries: 1
- Pass deflections: 5
- Stats at Pro Football Reference

Travis Jones (born October 15, 1999) is an American professional football nose tackle for the Baltimore Ravens of the National Football League (NFL). He played college football for the UConn Huskies and was selected by the Ravens in the 3rd round, 76th overall in the 2022 NFL draft.

== Early life ==
Jones attended Wilbur Cross High School in New Haven, Connecticut. He committed to the University of Connecticut to play college football.

== College career ==
Jones played at UConn from 2018 to 2021. He did not play in 2020, after Connecticut cancelled their season due to the COVID-19 pandemic. He finished his college career with 134 tackles and 8.5 sacks.

== Professional career ==
Pre-draft measurables
Height	Weight	Arm length	Hand span	Wingspan	40-yard dash	10-yard split	20-yard split	20-yard shuttle	Three-cone drill	Vertical jump	Broad jump
6 ft 4 3/8 in (1.94 m)	325 lb (147 kg)	34 1/4 in (0.87 m)	10 1/4 in (0.26 m)	6 ft 9 1/2 in (2.07 m)	4.92 s	1.76 s	2.92 s	4.58 s	7.33 s	28.5 in (0.72 m)	9 ft 2 in (2.79 m)
All values from NFL Combine

Jones was drafted by the Baltimore Ravens in the third round, 76th overall, of the 2022 NFL draft. He recorded his first sack in Week 6 against the New York Giants.

After two years as a backup and rotational defensive tackle, Jones was named a full-time starter in 2024 and 2025.

On December 11, 2025, Jones agreed to a three-year, $40.5 million contract extension with the Ravens.

== NFL career statistics ==
Legend
**Bold**	Career high

=== Regular season ===
Year	Team	Games		Tackles					Interceptions						Fumbles				
Year	Team	GP	GS	Cmb	Solo	Ast	Sck	TFL	Int	Yds	Avg	Lng	TD	PD	FF	Fmb	FR	Yds	TD
2022	BAL	15	3	24	14	10	1.0	1	0	0	0.0	0	0	1	0	0	0	0	0
2023	BAL	17	0	36	20	16	1.5	4	0	0	0.0	0	0	**2**	0	0	0	0	0
2024	BAL	17	15	42	**22**	20	1.0	4	0	0	0.0	0	0	0	0	0	0	0	0
2025	BAL	16	16	**47**	20	**27**	**5.0**	**9**	0	0	0.0	0	0	**2**	**1**	0	**1**	0	0
Career		65	34	149	76	73	8.5	18	0	0	0.0	0	0	5	1	0	1	0	0

=== Postseason ===
Year	Team	Games		Tackles					Interceptions						Fumbles				
Year	Team	GP	GS	Cmb	Solo	Ast	Sck	TFL	Int	Yds	Avg	Lng	TD	PD	FF	Fmb	FR	Yds	TD
2022	BAL	1	0	1	0	1	0.0	0	0	0	0.0	0	0	0	0	0	0	0	0
2023	BAL	2	0	**4**	**1**	**3**	0.0	0	0	0	0.0	0	0	**1**	0	0	0	0	0
2024	BAL	2	2	**4**	**1**	**3**	0.0	0	0	0	0.0	0	0	0	0	0	0	0	0
Career		5	2	9	2	7	0.0	0	0	0	0.0	0	0	1	0	0	0	0	0
