= 2024 Baltimore Ravens season =

29th season in franchise history

- Owner: Steve Bisciotti
- General manager: Eric DeCosta
- Head coach: John Harbaugh
- Offensive coordinator: Todd Monken
- Defensive coordinator: Zach Orr
- Home stadium: M&T Bank Stadium

Results
- Record: 12–5
- Division place: 1st AFC North
- Playoffs: Won Wild Card Playoffs (vs. Steelers) 28–14; Lost Divisional Playoffs (at Bills) 25–27
- All-Pros: 6: QB Lamar Jackson (1st team); FB Patrick Ricard (1st team); LB Roquan Smith (1st team); SCB Marlon Humphrey (1st team); RB Derrick Henry (2nd team); S Kyle Hamilton (2nd team)
- Pro Bowlers: 11: QB Lamar Jackson; RB Derrick Henry; FB Patrick Ricard; WR Zay Flowers; T Ronnie Stanley; C Tyler Linderbaum; DT Nnamdi Madubuike; OLB Kyle Van Noy; ILB Roquan Smith; CB Marlon Humphrey; SS Kyle Hamilton

Uniform
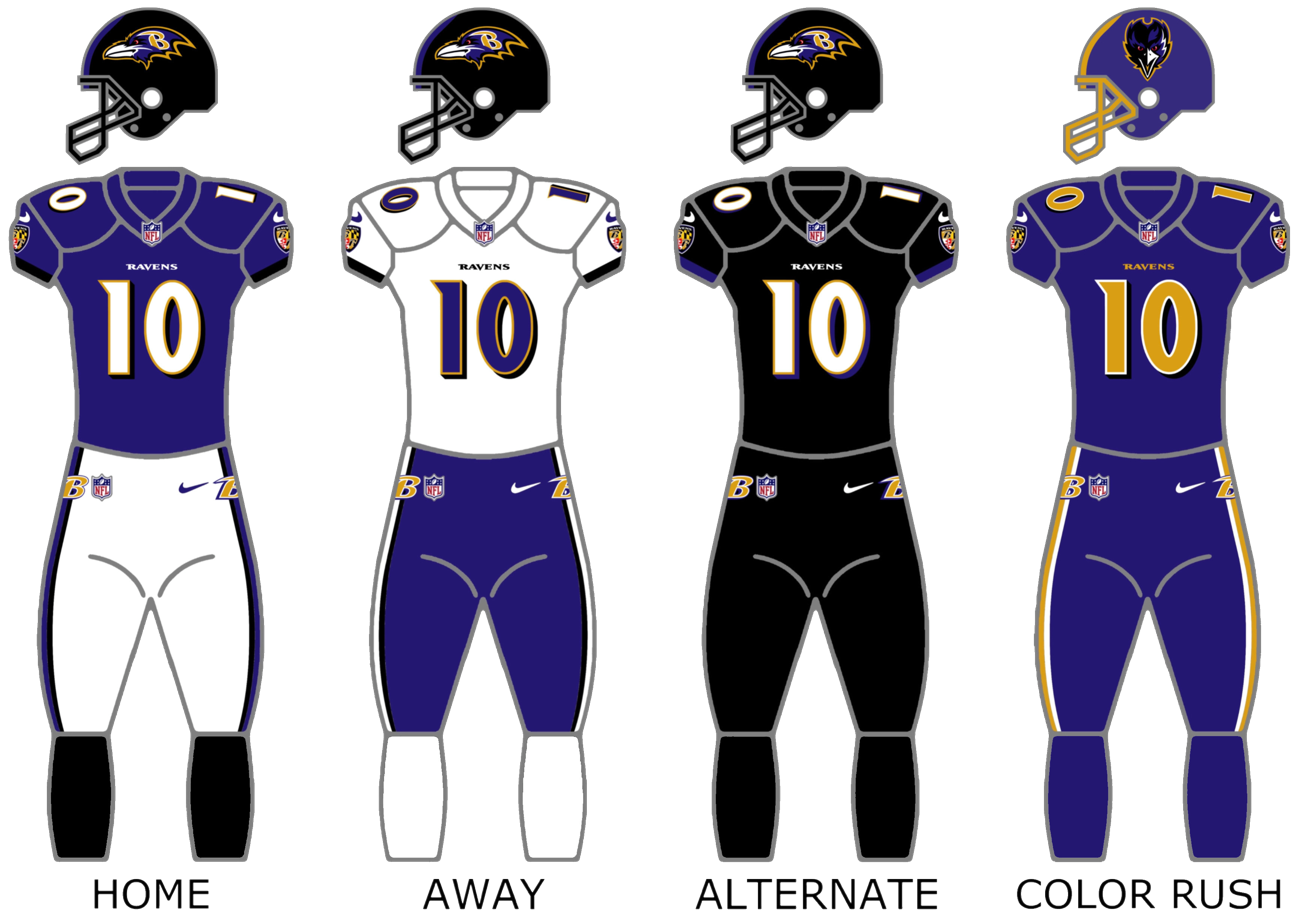

The 2024 season was the Baltimore Ravens' 29th in the National Football League (NFL) and their 17th under head coach John Harbaugh. The team failed to match or improve on their 13–4 record from 2023 after a loss to the eventual Super Bowl LIX champion Philadelphia Eagles in Week 13.

The Ravens publicly announced that they would honor the 2024 season to the recently deceased Jacoby Jones, former wide receiver, and Joe D'Alessandris, former offensive line coach.

The Ravens started 0–2 for the first time since 2015, but won 12 of their last 15 games the rest of the way to finish the season 12–5, including 9 victories over teams that had a winning record. With Lamar Jackson's five touchdown performance in the Ravens win in Week 7, the Ravens became the first team in NFL history with players winning Offensive Player of the Week in four consecutive weeks (Derrick Henry won the honor in week 4 and 6 while Lamar Jackson won the honor for week 5 and 7). Following a Week 16 victory against the AFC North rival Pittsburgh Steelers, the Ravens clinched a playoff spot for the third consecutive season and their sixth in seven years. In Week 18, they won the AFC North title for the second year in a row with a win over the Cleveland Browns. The Ravens finished the regular season accumulating 7224 total offensive yards, the most in franchise history. The Ravens would also become the first team in NFL history to have 4000 passing yards and 3000 rushing yards in the same regular season. They also had 5.8 yards per carry during the season, which is the 2nd most in NFL history behind only the 1948 San Francisco 49ers. Lamar Jackson had one of the most efficient passing seasons of all time by throwing 4,172 yards, 41 touchdowns, 4 interceptions, and completed 66.7 percent of his passes to go with his 119.6 passer rating, which was the 4th highest single-season passer rating in NFL history. Zay Flowers was selected to play in the Pro Bowl, making him the first Baltimore Raven wide receiver to earn this honor.

NFL statistician Aaron Schatz calculated that the 2024 Ravens' offense was, play-for-play, the 4th most efficient offense since the AFL-NFL Merger in 1970, behind only the 2007 New England Patriots, the 1982 San Diego Chargers, and the 2010 Patriots.

The Ravens opened up their postseason run with a 28–14 win over the Steelers in the Wild Card Round to advance to the Divisional Round but were defeated by the Buffalo Bills by a score of 27–25, ending Baltimore's season.

== Offseason ==
=== Free agents ===
Position	Player	Tag	2024 team	Date signed	Contract
WR	Nelson Agholor	UFA	Baltimore Ravens	February 18, 2024	1 year, $3.75 million
WR	Odell Beckham Jr.	UFA	Miami Dolphins	May 3, 2024	1 year, $8.25 million
OLB	Jadeveon Clowney	UFA	Carolina Panthers	March 27, 2024	2 year, $20 million
RB	Dalvin Cook	UFA	Dallas Cowboys	August 28, 2024	1 year, $383,400
CB	Ronald Darby	UFA	Jacksonville Jaguars	March 13, 2024	2 year, $10 million
RB	J. K. Dobbins	UFA	Los Angeles Chargers	April 18, 2024	1 year, $1.6 million
WR	Devin Duvernay	UFA	Jacksonville Jaguars	March 13, 2024	2 year, $8.5 million
RB	Gus Edwards	UFA	Los Angeles Chargers	March 13, 2024	2 years, $6.5 million
LB	Malik Harrison	UFA	Baltimore Ravens	March 13, 2024	1 year, $2.74 million
QB	Tyler Huntley	UFA	Cleveland Browns	March 17, 2024	1 year, $1.29 million
QB	Josh Johnson	UFA	Baltimore Ravens	March 14, 2024	1 year, $1.38 million
DE	Justin Madubuike	UFA	Baltimore Ravens	March 5, 2024	4 years, $98 million
CB	Arthur Maulet	UFA	Baltimore Ravens	March 19, 2024	2 years, $4 million
C	Sam Mustipher	UFA	Denver Broncos	April 4, 2024	1 year, $1.13 million
LS	Tyler Ott	UFA	Washington Commanders	March 13, 2024	3 years, $4.39 million
LB	Del'Shawn Phillips	UFA	Houston Texans	March 13, 2024	1 year, $2.6 million
ILB	Patrick Queen	UFA	Pittsburgh Steelers	March 13, 2024	3 years, $41 million
OG	John Simpson	UFA	New York Jets	March 13, 2024	2 years, $18 million
S	Geno Stone	UFA	Cincinnati Bengals	March 13, 2024	2 years, $15 million
DE	Brent Urban	UFA	Baltimore Ravens	March 13. 2024	1 year, $1.37 million
OLB	Kyle Van Noy	UFA	Baltimore Ravens	April 4, 2024	2 years, $9 million
S	Ar'Darius Washington	RFA	Baltimore Ravens	March 13, 2024	1 year, $1.05 million
CB	Daryl Worley	UFA	Baltimore Ravens	July 23, 2024	1 year, $1.21 million
CB	Rock Ya-Sin	UFA	San Francisco 49ers	April 11, 2024	1 year, $1.29 million
OG	Kevin Zeitler	UFA	Detroit Lions	March 18, 2024	1 year, $6 million

=== Signings ===
Position	Player	Previous team	Date signed	Contract
RB	Derrick Henry	Tennessee Titans	March 13, 2024	2 year, $16 million
ILB	Chris Board	New England Patriots	March 19, 2024	1 year, $1.29 million
OT	Josh Jones	Houston Texans	March 21, 2024	1 year, $1.79 million
CB	Ka'dar Hollman	Houston Texans	March 22, 2024	1 year, $1.06 million
WR	Deonte Harty	Buffalo Bills	April 10, 2024	1 year, $1.29 million
FS	Eddie Jackson	Chicago Bears	July 19, 2024	1 year, 1.5 million
WR	Anthony Miller	Kansas City Chiefs	August 11, 2024	1 year, 1.13 million

=== Players lost ===
Position	Player	Reason	2024 team	Date
OLB	Tyus Bowser	Released	Seattle Seahawks	March 13, 2024
OT	Morgan Moses	Traded	New York Jets	March 13, 2024

== Draft ==
2024 Baltimore Ravens draft selections
Round	Selection	Player	Position	College	Notes
1	30	Nate Wiggins	CB	Clemson	
2	62	Roger Rosengarten	OT	Washington	
3	93	Adisa Isaac	OLB	Penn State	
4	113	Devontez Walker	WR	North Carolina	From Jets (Note: The Ravens traded OT Morgan Moses and a 2024 fourth-round selection (134th overall) to the New York Jets in exchange for 2024 fourth- and sixth-round selections (112th and 218th overall).)
4	130	T. J. Tampa	CB	Iowa State	
4	134	Traded to the New York Jets			
5	165	Rasheen Ali	RB	Marshall	
6	206	Traded to the Cleveland Browns (Note: The Ravens traded a sixth-round selection (206th overall) to the Cleveland Browns in exchange for a 2023 seventh-round selection (229th overall).)			
6	218	Devin Leary	QB	Kentucky	From Jets
7	228	Nick Samac	C	Michigan State	From Jets (Note: The Ravens traded S Chuck Clark to the New York Jets in exchange for a seventh-round selection (228th overall).)
7	250	Sanoussi Kane	S	Purdue	

Draft trades

2024 Baltimore Ravens undrafted free agents
Name	Position	College	Ref.
Jelani Baker	WR	Limestone	
Beau Brade	S	Maryland	
Jack Browning	P	San Diego State	
Corey Bullock	G	Maryland	
Tre'Darious Colbert	DT	Maryland	
Chris Collier	RB	Lock Haven	
Bump Cooper Jr.	CB	Oregon State	
Darrian Dalcourt	G	Alabama	
Joe Evans	OLB	Iowa	
Ja'Mion Franklin	DT	Duke	
DeAngelo Hardy	WR	North Central	
Qadir Ismail	WR	Samford	
Deion Jennings	LB	Rutgers	
Emory Jones	QB	Cincinnati	
Julian Pearl	OT	Illinois	
Randen Plattner	LS	Kansas State	
C. J. Ravenell	DE	Missouri Western	
Yvandy Rigby	LB	Temple	
Mike Rigerman	TE	Findlay	
Tayvion Robinson	WR	Kentucky	
Riley Sharp	TE	Oregon State	
Darrell Simpson	OT	Tulsa	
Jordan Toles	S	Morgan State	
Dayton Wade	WR	Ole Miss	
Tramel Walthour	DE	Georgia	
Isaiah Washington	WR	Rutgers	

Key
Made roster
Made practice squad
Did not make roster

== Staff ==
=== Coaching changes ===
2023 Baltimore Ravens Staff Changes
Coach	Position	Reason left	Replacement
Joe Hortiz	Director of player personnel	Accepted job with Los Angeles Chargers	N/A
Mike Macdonald	Defensive coordinator	Accepted job with Seattle Seahawks	Zach Orr
Dennard Wilson	Defensive backs coach	Accepted job with Tennessee Titans	Doug Mallory
Zach Orr	Inside linebackers coach	Promoted to defensive coordinator	Mark DeLeone
Anthony Weaver	Defensive line coach	Accepted job with Miami Dolphins	Dennis Johnson
Mike Devlin	Assistant offensive line coach	Accepted job with Los Angeles Chargers	Travelle Wharton
Keith Williams	Assistant wide receivers coach	Accepted job with New Orleans Saints	N/A
David Blackburn	Director of college scouting	Accepted job with Washington Commanders	Andrew Raphael
Joe D'Alessandris	Offensive line coach	Died	George Warhop

2024 Baltimore Ravens staff
Front office: Owner – Steve Bisciotti; President – Sashi Brown; Executive vice president/general manager – Eric DeCosta; Executive vice president – Ozzie Newsome; Vice president of player personnel – George Kokinis; Director of player personnel – Mark Azevedo; Director of college scouting – Andrew Raphael; Assistant director of college scouting – Joey Cleary; Assistant director of pro personnel – Corey Frazier; Vice president of football administration – Nick Matteo; Consultant – Pat Moriarty; Head coaches: Head coach – John Harbaugh; Assistant head coach/pass game coordinator – Chris Hewitt; Offensive coaches: Offensive coordinator – Todd Monken; Quarterbacks – Tee Martin; Director of football strategy/assistant quarterbacks – Daniel Stern; Running backs – Willie Taggart; Wide receivers – Greg Lewis; Tight ends – George Godsey; Offensive line – George Warhop; Assistant offensive line – Travelle Wharton; Run game coordinator – Travis Switzer; Offensive assistant – Danny Breyer; Offensive quality control – Adam Schrack; Offensive football analyst – Prentice Gill	Defensive coaches: Defensive coordinator – Zachary Orr; Senior advisor – Dean Pees; Defensive line – Dennis Johnson; Assistant defensive line/outside linebackers – Matt Robinson; Inside linebackers – Mark DeLeone; Secondary – Doug Mallory; Pass rush coach – Chuck Smith; Assistant to the head coach/defensive assistant – Megan Rosburg; Defensive quality control – Brendan Clark; Defensive football analyst – Noah Riley; Special teams coaches: Special teams coordinator – Chris Horton; Senior special teams – Randy Brown; Assistant special teams – Sam Koch; Strength and conditioning: Director of high performance – Sam Rosengarten; Strength and conditioning coordinator – Scott Elliott; Assistant strength and conditioning – Kaelyn Buskey; Strength and conditioning intern – Kevin Hartman; Strength and conditioning – Ron Shrift; Strength and conditioning – Anthony Watson

== Final roster ==
2024 Baltimore Ravens roster
Quarterbacks (QB): 8 Lamar Jackson; 17 Josh Johnson; Running backs (RB): 26 Rasheen Ali; 22 Derrick Henry; 43 Justice Hill; 34 Keaton Mitchell; 42 Patrick Ricard; Wide receivers (WR): 15 Nelson Agholor; 7 Rashod Bateman; 4 Zay Flowers; 18 Steven Sims; 81 Devontez Walker; 16 Tylan Wallace; Tight ends (TE): 89 Mark Andrews; 88 Charlie Kolar; 80 Isaiah Likely	Offensive linemen (OL): 66 Ben Cleveland G; 77 Daniel Faalele G; 74 Josh Jones T; 64 Tyler Linderbaum C; 65 Patrick Mekari G/T; 70 Roger Rosengarten T; 61 Nick Samac C; 79 Ronnie Stanley T; 72 Andrew Vorhees G; Defensive linemen (DL): 98 Travis Jones NT; 92 Nnamdi Madubuike DE; 58 Michael Pierce NT; 97 Brent Urban DE; 96 Broderick Washington DE	Linebackers (LB): 49 Chris Board ILB; 40 Malik Harrison OLB/ILB; 50 Adisa Isaac OLB; 90 David Ojabo OLB; 99 Odafe Oweh OLB; 95 Tavius Robinson OLB; 23 Trenton Simpson ILB; 0 Roquan Smith ILB; 53 Kyle Van Noy OLB; 54 Kristian Welch ILB; Defensive backs (DB): 24 Beau Brade SS; 14 Kyle Hamilton SS; 44 Marlon Humphrey CB; 28 Sanoussi Kane SS; 21 Brandon Stephens CB; 27 T. J. Tampa CB; 29 Ar'Darius Washington FS; 25 Tre'Davious White CB; 2 Nate Wiggins CB; 32 Marcus Williams FS; Special teams (ST): 46 Nick Moore LS; 11 Jordan Stout P; 9 Justin Tucker K	Practice squad: 71 Malaesala Aumavae–Laulu G; 67 Corey Bullock T; 12 Malik Cunningham WR; 76 Darrian Dalcourt G; 83 Qadir Ismail TE (PS/I); 33 Anthony Kendall CB; 35 Desmond King CB; 87 Keith Kirkwood WR; 57 William Kwenkeu ILB; 13 Devin Leary QB; 6 Anthony Miller WR; 84 Zaire Mitchell-Paden TE; 94 Adedayo Odeleye DE (IPP); 68 C. J. Ravenell DE; 69 Josh Tupou NT; 82 Dayton Wade WR; 85 Scotty Washington TE; 93 Chris Wormley DE; Reserve: 5 Jalyn Armour-Davis CB (IR); 59 Malik Hamm OLB (IR); 3 Deonte Harty WR (IR); 45 Christian Matthew CB (IR); 10 Arthur Maulet CB (IR); 30 Trayvon Mullen CB (IR); 36 Owen Wright RB (IR); Rookies in italics 53 active, 7 reserve, 16 practice squad (2 exempt)

=== Trades ===
2024 Baltimore Ravens trades
Team	Received	Compensation	Date
Carolina Panthers	WR Diontae Johnson; 2025 NFL draft 6th round selection	2025 NFL draft 5th round selection (Note: Since Johnson left Baltimore in the offseason, the Ravens received a compensatory pick.)	October 29
Los Angeles Rams	CB Tre'Davious White; 2027 NFL draft 7th round selection	2026 NFL draft 7th round selection	November 5

== Preseason ==
Week	Date	Opponent	Result	Record	Venue	Recap
1	August 9	Philadelphia Eagles	L 13–16	0–1	M&T Bank Stadium	Recap
2	August 17	Atlanta Falcons	W 13–12	1–1	M&T Bank Stadium	Recap
3	August 24	at Green Bay Packers	L 7–30	1–2	Lambeau Field	Recap

== Regular season ==
=== Schedule ===
Week	Date	Opponent	Result	Record	Venue	Recap
1	September 5	at Kansas City Chiefs	**L** 20–27	0–1	Arrowhead Stadium	Recap
2	September 15	Las Vegas Raiders	**L** 23–26	0–2	M&T Bank Stadium	Recap
3	September 22	at Dallas Cowboys	**W** 28–25	1–2	AT&T Stadium	Recap
4	September 29	Buffalo Bills	**W** 35–10	2–2	M&T Bank Stadium	Recap
5	October 6	at **Cincinnati Bengals**	**W** 41–38 (OT)	3–2	Paycor Stadium	Recap
6	October 13	Washington Commanders	**W** 30–23	4–2	M&T Bank Stadium	Recap
7	October 21	at Tampa Bay Buccaneers	**W** 41–31	5–2	Raymond James Stadium	Recap
8	October 27	at **Cleveland Browns**	**L** 24–29	5–3	Huntington Bank Field	Recap
9	November 3	Denver Broncos	**W** 41–10	6–3	M&T Bank Stadium	Recap
10	November 7	**Cincinnati Bengals**	**W** 35–34	7–3	M&T Bank Stadium	Recap
11	November 17	at **Pittsburgh Steelers**	**L** 16–18	7–4	Acrisure Stadium	Recap
12	November 25	at Los Angeles Chargers	**W** 30–23	8–4	SoFi Stadium	Recap
13	December 1	Philadelphia Eagles	**L** 19–24	8–5	M&T Bank Stadium	Recap
14	Bye					
15	December 15	at New York Giants	**W** 35–14	9–5	MetLife Stadium	Recap
16	December 21	**Pittsburgh Steelers**	**W** 34–17	10–5	M&T Bank Stadium	Recap
17	December 25	at Houston Texans	**W** 31–2	11–5	NRG Stadium	Recap
18	January 4	**Cleveland Browns**	**W** 35–10	12–5	M&T Bank Stadium	Recap

Note: Intra-division opponents are in bold text.

=== Game summaries ===
==== Week 1: Kansas City Chiefs 27, Baltimore Ravens 20 ====
NFL Kickoff Game

Week 1: Baltimore Ravens at Kansas City Chiefs – Game summary

Quarter	1	2	3	4	Total
Ravens	7	3	0	10	**20**
**Chiefs**	7	6	7	7	**27**

at Arrowhead Stadium, Kansas City, Missouri

- Date: September 5
- Game time: 8:40 p.m. EDT/7:40 p.m. CDT (Note: The game was initially scheduled for 8:20 pm but got delayed due to lightning.)
- Game weather: Overcast, 67 °F (19 °C)
- Game attendance: 73,611
- Referee: Shawn Hochuli
- TV announcers (NBC/Peacock): Mike Tirico, Cris Collinsworth and Melissa Stark
- Recap, Game Book

Game information

**First quarter**

- BAL – Derrick Henry 5-yard run (Justin Tucker kick), 8:14. Ravens 7–0. **Drive: 11 plays, 70 yards, 6:46.**
- KC – Xavier Worthy 21-yard run (Harrison Butker kick), 5:55. Tied 7–7. **Drive: 5 plays, 67 yards, 2:19.**

**Second quarter**

- KC – Harrison Butker 32-yard field goal, 13:37. Chiefs 10–7. **Drive: 4 plays, 1 yard, 1:07.**
- KC – Harrison Butker 31-yard field goal, 5:44. Chiefs 13–7. **Drive: 8 plays, 38 yards, 3:55.**
- BAL – Justin Tucker 25-yard field goal, 0:03. Chiefs 13–10. **Drive: 10 plays, 44 yards, 1:41.**

**Third quarter**

- KC – Isiah Pacheco 1-yard run (Harrison Butker kick), 11:28. Chiefs 20–10. **Drive: 6 plays, 81 yards, 3:32.**

**Fourth quarter**

- BAL – Isaiah Likely 49-yard pass from Lamar Jackson (Justin Tucker kick), 14:47. Chiefs 20–17. **Drive: 7 plays, 80 yards, 3:50.**
- KC – Xavier Worthy 35-yard pass from Patrick Mahomes (Harrison Butker kick), 10:25. Chiefs 27–17. **Drive: 8 plays, 70 yards, 4:22.**
- BAL – Justin Tucker 32-yard field goal, 4:54. Chiefs 27–20. **Drive: 13 plays, 56 yards, 5:31.**

**Top passers**

- BAL – Lamar Jackson – 26/41, 273 yards, TD
- KC – Patrick Mahomes – 20/28, 291 yards, TD, INT

**Top rushers**

- BAL – Lamar Jackson – 16 rushes, 122 yards
- KC – Isiah Pacheco – 15 rushes, 45 yards, TD

**Top receivers**

- BAL – Isaiah Likely – 9 receptions, 111 yards, TD
- KC – Rashee Rice – 7 receptions, 103 yards

Following several mistakes in the 2nd quarter, including a fumble, turnover on downs, a missed field goal, as well as multiple illegal formation penalties, the Ravens fell behind 13–10 to the Chiefs at halftime. After getting the ball down 27–20, Lamar Jackson and the Ravens marched to the Chiefs 10-yard line, but on the final play of the game, while initially ruled a touchdown, a replay revealed Isaiah Likely's toe was out of bounds, thus giving the Chiefs the victory.

With the loss, the Ravens began the season 0–1.

==== Week 2: Las Vegas Raiders 26, Baltimore Ravens 23 ====
Week 2: Las Vegas Raiders at Baltimore Ravens – Game summary

Quarter	1	2	3	4	Total
**Raiders**	0	6	7	13	**26**
Ravens	3	6	7	7	**23**

at M&T Bank Stadium, Baltimore, Maryland

- Date: September 15
- Game time: 1:00 p.m. EDT
- Game weather: Clear, 78 °F (26 °C)
- Game attendance: 70,762
- Referee: Tra Blake
- TV announcers (CBS): Andrew Catalon, Tiki Barber and A.J. Ross
- Recap, Game Book

Game information

**First quarter**

- BAL – Justin Tucker 48-yard field goal, 8:29. Ravens 3–0. **Drive: 7 plays, 25 yards, 4:10.**

**Second quarter**

- LV – Daniel Carlson 53-yard field goal, 9:19. Tied 3–3. **Drive: 8 plays, 37 yards, 4:47.**
- BAL – Justin Tucker 42-yard field goal, 6:00. Ravens 6–3. **Drive: 7 plays, 25 yards, 4:10.**
- LV – Daniel Carlson 51-yard field goal, 1:37. Tied 6–6. **Drive: 5 plays, 21 yards, 0:48.**
- BAL – Justin Tucker 32-yard field goal, 0:03. Ravens 9–6. **Drive: 10 plays, 56 yards, 1:34.**

**Third quarter**

- BAL – Zay Flowers 8-yard pass from Lamar Jackson (Justin Tucker kick), 11:42. Ravens 16–6. **Drive: 6 plays, 70 yards, 3:18.**
- LV – Alexander Mattison 1-yard run (Daniel Carlson kick), 2:36. Ravens 16–13. **Drive: 7 plays, 46 yards, 3:32.**

**Fourth quarter**

- BAL – Derrick Henry 3-yard run (Justin Tucker kick), 12:11. Ravens 23–13. **Drive: 9 plays, 76 yards, 5:25.**
- LV – Daniel Carlson 25-yard field goal, 9:21. Ravens 23–16. **Drive: 7 plays, 64 yards, 2:50.**
- LV – Davante Adams 1-yard pass from Gardner Minshew (Daniel Carlson kick), 3:54. Tied 23–23. **Drive: 9 plays, 70 yards, 3:42.**
- LV – Daniel Carlson 38-yard field goal, 0:27. Raiders 26–23. **Drive: 6 plays, 24 yards, 1:54.**

**Top passers**

- LV – Gardner Minshew – 30/38, 276 yards, TD, INT
- BAL – Lamar Jackson – 21/34, 247 yards, TD, INT

**Top rushers**

- LV – Zamir White – 9 rushes, 24 yards
- BAL – Derrick Henry – 17 rushes, 79 yards, TD

**Top receivers**

- LV – Davante Adams – 9 receptions, 110 yards, TD
- BAL – Zay Flowers – 7 receptions, 91 yards, TD

The Ravens blew two 10-point leads and were upset by the Raiders 26–23. It was the second consecutive season that the Ravens were upset by Gardner Minshew-led teams and dropped their record to 0–2 for the first time since 2015.

==== Week 3: Baltimore Ravens 28, Dallas Cowboys 25 ====
Week 3: Baltimore Ravens at Dallas Cowboys – Game summary

Quarter	1	2	3	4	Total
**Ravens**	14	7	7	0	**28**
Cowboys	3	3	0	19	**25**

at AT&T Stadium, Arlington, Texas

- Date: September 22
- Game time: 4:25 p.m. EDT/3:25 p.m. CDT
- Game weather: None (retractable roof closed)
- Game attendance: 93,566
- Referee: Ronald Torbert
- TV announcers (Fox): Kevin Burkhardt, Tom Brady, Erin Andrews and Tom Rinaldi
- Recap, Game Book

Game information

**First quarter**

- BAL – Lamar Jackson 9-yard run (Justin Tucker kick), 9:36. Ravens 7–0. **Drive: 5 plays, 71 yards, 2:27.**
- DAL – Brandon Aubrey 65-yard field goal, 6:33. Ravens 7–3. **Drive: 7 plays, 24 yards, 3:03.**
- BAL – Derrick Henry 1-yard run (Justin Tucker kick), 2:41. Ravens 14–3. **Drive: 7 plays, 70 yards, 3:52.**

**Second quarter**

- BAL – Rashod Bateman 13-yard pass from Lamar Jackson (Justin Tucker kick), 0:25. Ravens 21–3. **Drive: 8 plays, 88 yards, 2:42.**
- DAL – Brandon Aubrey 51-yard field goal, 0:02. Ravens 21–6. **Drive: 3 plays, 37 yards, 0:23.**

**Third quarter**

- BAL – Derrick Henry 26-yard run (Justin Tucker kick), 11:58. Ravens 28–6. **Drive: 5 plays, 70 yards, 3:02.**

**Fourth quarter**

- DAL – Dak Prescott 1-yard run (pass failed), 8:53. Ravens 28–12. **Drive: 6 plays, 64 yards, 1:48.**
- DAL – Jalen Tolbert 15-yard pass from Dak Prescott (pass failed), 7:07. Ravens 28–18. **Drive: 7 plays, 56 yards, 1:46.**
- DAL – KaVontae Turpin 16-yard pass from Dak Prescott (Brandon Aubrey kick), 2:53. Ravens 28–25. **Drive: 11 plays, 91 yards, 2:33.**

**Top passers**

- BAL – Lamar Jackson – 12/15, 182 yards, TD
- DAL – Dak Prescott – 28/51, 379 yards, 2 TD

**Top rushers**

- BAL – Derrick Henry – 25 rushes, 151 yards, 2 TD
- DAL – Rico Dowdle – 8 rushes, 32 yards

**Top receivers**

- BAL – Nelson Agholor – 1 reception, 56 yards
- DAL – Jake Ferguson – 6 receptions, 95 yards

The Ravens raced out to a 28–6 3rd quarter lead behind two rushing touchdowns by Derrick Henry, a rushing touchdown by Lamar Jackson, and a receiving touchdown by Rashod Bateman. After a missed field goal by Justin Tucker in the fourth quarter, the Cowboys scored 19 unanswered points to close the gap to 28–25, but the Ravens were able to run out the final 2:53 to preserve their first victory of the season.

==== Week 4: Baltimore Ravens 35, Buffalo Bills 10 ====
Week 4: Buffalo Bills at Baltimore Ravens – Game summary

Quarter	1	2	3	4	Total
Bills	3	0	7	0	**10**
**Ravens**	7	14	7	7	**35**

at M&T Bank Stadium, Baltimore, Maryland

- Date: September 29
- Game time: 8:20 p.m. EDT
- Game weather: Cloudy, 68 °F (20 °C)
- Game attendance: 70,636
- Referee: Alan Eck
- TV announcers (NBC): Mike Tirico, Cris Collinsworth and Melissa Stark
- Recap, Game Book

Game information

**First quarter**

- BAL – Derrick Henry 87-yard run (Justin Tucker kick), 10:50. Ravens 7–0. **Drive: 1 play, 87 yards, 0:12.**
- BUF – Tyler Bass 50-yard field goal, 4:34. Ravens 7–3. **Drive: 11 plays, 38 yards, 6:16.**

**Second quarter**

- BAL – Derrick Henry 5-yard pass from Lamar Jackson (Justin Tucker kick), 14:55. Ravens 14–3. **Drive: 9 plays, 70 yards, 4:39.**
- BAL – Justice Hill 19-yard pass from Lamar Jackson (Justin Tucker kick), 7:34. Ravens 21–3. **Drive: 10 plays, 81 yards, 5:16.**

**Third quarter**

- BUF – Ty Johnson 3-yard run (Tyler Bass kick), 11:26. Ravens 21–10. **Drive: 4 plays, 60 yards, 2:27.**
- BAL – Lamar Jackson 9-yard run (Justin Tucker kick), 2:45. Ravens 28–10. **Drive: 6 play, 59 yards, 3:35.**

**Fourth quarter**

- BAL – Patrick Ricard fumble recovery in the end zone (Justin Tucker kick), 11:23. Ravens 35–10. **Drive: 6 plays, 62 yards, 3:32.**

**Top passers**

- BUF – Josh Allen – 16/29, 180 yards,
- BAL – Lamar Jackson – 13/17, 156 yards, 2 TD

**Top rushers**

- BUF – James Cook – 9 rushes, 39 yards
- BAL – Derrick Henry – 24 rushes, 199 yards, TD

**Top receivers**

- BUF – Khalil Shakir – 4 receptions, 62 yards
- BAL – Justice Hill – 6 receptions, 78 yards, TD

Derrick Henry had an 87-yard touchdown run on the Ravens’ first offensive play en route to a 35–10 rout of the previously 3–0 Buffalo Bills. Henry finished with 199 rushing yards and the aforementioned touchdown while also having 3 receptions for 10 yards and a touchdown. His performance won him the AFC Offensive Player of the Week award. With the win, the Ravens got back to .500 at 2–2.

==== Week 5: Baltimore Ravens 41, Cincinnati Bengals 38 ====
Week 5: Baltimore Ravens at Cincinnati Bengals – Game summary

Quarter	1	2	3	4	OT	Total
**Ravens**	7	7	7	17	3	**41**
Bengals	0	17	7	14	0	**38**

at Paycor Stadium, Cincinnati, Ohio

- Date: October 6
- Game time: 1:00 p.m. EDT
- Game weather: Mostly sunny, 81 °F (27 °C)
- Game attendance: 66,341
- Referee: Bill Vinovich
- TV announcers (CBS): Kevin Harlan, Trent Green and Melanie Collins
- Recap, Game Book

Game information

**First quarter**

- BAL – Derrick Henry 1-yard run (Justin Tucker kick), 8:54. Ravens 7–0. **Drive: 12 plays, 70 yards, 6:06.**

**Second quarter**

- CIN – Tee Higgins 11-yard pass from Joe Burrow (Evan McPherson kick), 13:44. Tied 7–7. **Drive: 10 plays, 86 yards, 4:45.**
- BAL – Rashod Bateman 16-yard pass from Lamar Jackson (Justin Tucker kick), 8:09. Ravens 14–7. **Drive: 7 plays, 51 yards, 2:59.**
- CIN – Derrick Henry tackled in the end zone by Sam Hubbard for a safety, 5:47. Ravens 14–9.
- CIN – Ja'Marr Chase 41-yard pass from Joe Burrow (Chase Brown run), 0:09. Bengals 17–14. **Drive: 4 plays, 79 yards, 0:25.**

**Third quarter**

- CIN – Tee Higgins 5-yard pass from Joe Burrow (Evan McPherson kick), 8:51. Bengals 24–14. **Drive: 12 plays, 70 yards, 6:09.**
- BAL – Isaiah Likely 1-yard pass from Lamar Jackson (Justin Tucker kick), 6:48. Bengals 24–21. **Drive: 4 plays, 74 yards, 2:13.**

**Fourth quarter**

- CIN – Chase Brown 4-yard pass from Joe Burrow (Evan McPherson kick), 14:19. Bengals 31–21. **Drive: 12 plays, 70 yards, 7:19.**
- BAL – Charlie Kolar 2-yard pass from Lamar Jackson (Justin Tucker kick), 9:05. Bengals 31–28. **Drive: 10 plays, 92 yards, 5:14.**
- CIN – Ja'Marr Chase 70-yard pass from Joe Burrow (Evan McPherson kick), 8:54. Bengals 38–28. **Drive: 1 play, 70 yards, 0:11.**
- BAL – Isaiah Likely 6-yard pass from Lamar Jackson (Justin Tucker kick), 5:24. Bengals 38–35. **Drive: 11 plays, 70 yards, 3:30.**
- BAL – Justin Tucker 56-yard field goal, 1:35. Tied 38–38. **Drive: 8 plays, 34 yards, 1:26.**

**Overtime**

- BAL – Justin Tucker 24-yard field goal, 3:33. Ravens 41–38. **Drive: 2 plays, 51 yards, 0:53.**

**Top passers**

- BAL – Lamar Jackson – 26/42, 348 yards, 4 TD
- CIN – Joe Burrow – 30/39, 392 yards, 5 TD, INT

**Top rushers**

- BAL – Derrick Henry – 15 rushes, 92 yards, TD
- CIN – Chase Brown – 12 rushes, 46 yards

**Top receivers**

- BAL – Zay Flowers – 7 receptions, 111 yards
- CIN – Ja’Marr Chase – 10 receptions, 193 yards, 2 TD

In a shootout overtime thriller, the Ravens overcame three 2nd half 10-point deficits to outlast the Bengals 41–38. Lamar Jackson accounted for 403 yards and four passing touchdowns and was named AFC offensive player of the week for his performance. Justin Tucker tied the game at 38-all with less than two minutes left in the fourth quarter with a 56-yard field goal after Marlon Humphrey intercepted Joe Burrow on the previous drive. The Bengals had a chance to win in overtime after a fumble by Jackson, but Evan McPherson missed a 53-yard field goal. Derrick Henry, who had 92 yards rushing and a touchdown in the game, then had a 51-yard rush to the Bengals 6-yard line and Tucker kicked a 24-yard field goal to win the game for the Ravens. The victory improved the Ravens record to 3–2.

==== Week 6: Baltimore Ravens 30, Washington Commanders 23 ====
Week 6: Washington Commanders at Baltimore Ravens – Game summary

Quarter	1	2	3	4	Total
Commanders	3	7	3	10	**23**
**Ravens**	3	14	10	3	**30**

at M&T Bank Stadium, Baltimore, Maryland

- Date: October 13
- Game time: 1:00 p.m. EDT
- Game weather: Clear, 75 °F (24 °C)
- Game attendance: 71,316
- Referee: Land Clark
- TV announcers (CBS): Jim Nantz, Tony Romo and Tracy Wolfson
- Recap, Game Book

Game information

**First quarter**

- WAS – Austin Seibert 42-yard field goal, 9:11. Commanders 3–0. **Drive: 7 plays, 25 yards, 3:36.**
- BAL – Justin Tucker 45-yard field goal, 3:45. Tied 3–3. **Drive: 10 plays, 43 yards, 5:26.**

**Second quarter**

- BAL – Derrick Henry 3-yard run (Justin Tucker kick), 7:55. Ravens 10–3. **Drive: 9 plays, 93 yards, 4:58.**
- WAS – Terry McLaurin 7-yard pass from Jayden Daniels (Austin Seibert kick), 4:16. Tied 10–10. **Drive: 8 plays, 70 yards, 3:39.**
- BAL – Mark Andrews 13-yard pass from Lamar Jackson (Justin Tucker kick), 0:53. Ravens 17–10. **Drive: 10 plays, 78 yards, 3:23.**

**Third quarter**

- WAS – Austin Seibert 55-yard field goal, 12:45. Ravens 17–13. **Drive: 6 plays, 33 yards, 2:15.**
- BAL – Justin Tucker 32-yard field goal, 8:19. Ravens 20–13. **Drive: 8 plays, 57 yards, 4:26.**
- BAL – Derrick Henry 7-yard run (Justin Tucker kick), 2:08. Ravens 27–13. **Drive: 8 plays, 94 yards, 4:42.**

**Fourth quarter**

- WAS – Terry McLaurin 6-yard pass from Jayden Daniels (Austin Seibert kick), 12:12. Ravens 27–20. **Drive: 12 plays, 70 yards, 4:56.**
- BAL – Justin Tucker 39-yard field goal, 6:18. Ravens 30–20. **Drive: 9 plays, 57 yards, 5:54.**
- WAS – Austin Seibert 49-yard field goal, 2:48. Ravens 30–23. **Drive: 8 plays, 40 yards, 3:30.**

**Top passers**

- WAS – Jayden Daniels – 24/35, 269 yards, 2 TD
- BAL – Lamar Jackson – 20/26, 323 yards, TD, INT

**Top rushers**

- WAS – Jayden Daniels – 6 rushes, 22 yards
- BAL – Derrick Henry – 24 rushes, 132 yards, 2 TD

**Top receivers**

- WAS – Zach Ertz – 4 receptions, 68 yards
- BAL – Zay Flowers – 9 receptions, 132 yards

In an unexpected marquee game of the week, Lamar Jackson outdueled Jayden Daniels with the help of Derrick Henry, who was named the AFC Offensive Player of the Week, as the Ravens defeated the Commanders 30–23 to improve to 4–2. Jackson and Henry accounted for 495 total yards and three touchdowns as the Ravens scored on five consecutive drives (3 TDs and 2 FGs) before running out the final 2:48 to end the game. Zay Flowers also had career day with 9 receptions for 132 yards in just the first half (he was not targeted in the 2nd half). With this win over the Commanders, the Ravens set an NFL record as the first team to post six straight games with at least 150 yards and one touchdown through the air and one on the ground. The win also moved Lamar Jackson to 22–1 vs NFC teams, a mark that stands as the best by a quarterback versus an opposing conference in NFL history.

==== Week 7: Baltimore Ravens 41, Tampa Bay Buccaneers 31 ====
Week 7: Baltimore Ravens at Tampa Bay Buccaneers – Game summary

Quarter	1	2	3	4	Total
**Ravens**	0	17	17	7	**41**
Buccaneers	10	0	0	21	**31**

at Raymond James Stadium, Tampa, Florida

- Date: October 21
- Game time: 8:15 p.m. EDT
- Game weather: Cloudy, 80 °F (27 °C)
- Game attendance: 64,828
- Referee: Alex Kemp
- TV announcers (ESPN/ABC/ESPN+): Joe Buck, Troy Aikman, and Laura Rutledge
- Recap, Game Book

Game information

**First quarter**

- TB – Mike Evans 25-yard pass from Baker Mayfield (Chase McLaughlin kick), 10:27. Buccaneers 7–0. **Drive: 8 plays, 70 yards, 4:33.**
- TB – Chase McLaughlin 23-yard field goal, 0:02. Buccaneers 10–0. **Drive: 11 plays, 75 yard, 6:03.**

**Second quarter**

- BAL – Mark Andrews 9-yard pass from Lamar Jackson (Justin Tucker kick), 14:47. Buccaneers 10–3. **Drive: 6 plays, 70 yards, 2:23.**
- BAL – Justice Hill 18-yard pass from Lamar Jackson (Justin Tucker kick), 4:23. Ravens 14–10. **Drive: 4 plays, 80 yards, 1:47.**
- BAL – Justin Tucker 28-yard field goal, 0:04. Ravens 17–10. **Drive: 10 plays, 50 yards, 2:54.**

**Third quarter**

- BAL – Justin Tucker 52-yard field goal, 12:20. Ravens 20–10. **Drive: 5 plays, 24 yards, 2:40.**
- BAL – Rashod Bateman 49-yard pass from Lamar Jackson (Justin Tucker kick), 7:25. Ravens 27–10. **Drive: 4 plays, 55 yards, 0:57.**
- BAL – Mark Andrews 4-yard pass from Lamar Jackson (Justin Tucker kick), 2:53. Ravens 34–10. **Drive: 5 plays, 92 yards, 2:05.**

**Fourth quarter**

- TB – Rachaad White 11-yard pass from Baker Mayfield (Baker Mayfield–Sterling Shepard pass), 11:24. Ravens 34–18. **Drive: 5 plays, 30 yards, 2:08.**
- BAL – Derrick Henry 13-yard pass from Lamar Jackson (Justin Tucker kick), 6:32. Ravens 41–18. **Drive: 8 plays, 70 yards, 4:52.**
- TB – Bucky Irving 1-yard run (pass failed), 3:46. Ravens 41–24. **Drive: 9 plays, 70 yards, 2:46.**
- TB – Rachaad White 23-yard pass from Baker Mayfield (Chase McLaughlin kick), 1:58. Ravens 41–31. **Drive: 7 plays, 52 yards, 1:48.**

**Top passers**

- BAL – Lamar Jackson – 17/22, 281 yards, 5 TD
- TB – Baker Mayfield – 31/45, 370 yards, 3 TD, 2 INT

**Top rushers**

- BAL – Derrick Henry – 15 rushes, 169 yards
- TB – Rachaad White – 10 rushes, 40 yards

**Top receivers**

- BAL – Rashod Bateman – 4 receptions, 121 yards, TD
- TB – Cade Otton – 8 receptions, 100 yards

Buccaneers QB Baker Mayfield looked sharp and the Ravens defense seemed to have no answer as the Bucs dominated the 1st quarter taking the early 10–0 lead. However, the next two quarters belonged to the Ravens as they scored 34 unanswered points with Ravens QB Lamar Jackson, who was named the AFC Offensive Player of the Week, tossing four touchdowns and the Ravens defense stiffened with two interceptions by CB Marlon Humphrey, although Humphrey was forced out of the game with a knee injury on his second interception. Jackson added another touchdown pass in the 4th quarter to Derrick Henry, who also rushed for 169 yards in the game, to open up a 41–18 lead with 6:32 remaining. The Bucs tried to make a furious rally in garbage time, but the deficit was too much to overcome as the Ravens won 41–31. With the win, the Ravens improved to 5–2.

==== Week 8: Cleveland Browns 29, Baltimore Ravens 24 ====
Week 8: Baltimore Ravens at Cleveland Browns – Game summary

Quarter	1	2	3	4	Total
Ravens	0	10	7	7	**24**
**Browns**	3	3	14	9	**29**

at Huntington Bank Field, Cleveland, Ohio

- Date: October 27
- Game time: 1:00 p.m. EDT
- Game weather: Sunny, 52 °F (11 °C)
- Game attendance: 67,431
- Referee: Shawn Smith
- TV announcers (CBS): Tom McCarthy, Jay Feely, Ross Tucker and Amanda Balionis
- Recap, Game Book

Game information

**First quarter**

- CLE – Dustin Hopkins 28-yard field goal, 0:37. Browns 3–0. **Drive: 14 plays, 81 yards, 8:08.**

**Second quarter**

- BAL – Justin Tucker 49-yard field goal, 11:51. Tied 3–3. **Drive: 7 plays, 40 yards, 3:46.**
- CLE – Dustin Hopkins 33-yard field goal, 3:41. Browns 6–3. **Drive: 10 plays, 52 yards, 5:39.**
- BAL – Nelson Agholor 11-yard pass from Lamar Jackson (Justin Tucker kick), 0:27. Ravens 10–6. **Drive: 2 plays, 25 yards, 0:41.**

**Third quarter**

- CLE – David Njoku 23-yard pass from Jameis Winston (Dustin Hopkins kick), 10:46. Browns 13–10. **Drive: 8 plays, 70 yards, 4:14.**
- BAL – Mark Andrews 7-yard pass from Lamar Jackson (Justin Tucker kick), 4:42. Ravens 17–13. **Drive: 6 plays, 62 yards, 2:59.**
- CLE – Cedric Tillman 22-yard pass from Jameis Winston (Dustin Hopkins kick), 2:01. Browns 20–17. **Drive: 6 plays, 72 yards, 2:41.**

**Fourth quarter**

- CLE – Dustin Hopkins 48-yard field goal, 4:55. Browns 23–17. **Drive: 8 plays, 32 yards, 4:11.**
- BAL – Derrick Henry 2-yard run (Justin Tucker kick), 2:36. Ravens 24–23. **Drive: 6 plays, 91 yards, 2:19.**
- CLE – Cedric Tillman 38-yard pass from Jameis Winston (pass failed), 0:59. Browns 29–24. **Drive: 9 plays, 69 yards, 1:37.**

**Top passers**

- BAL – Lamar Jackson – 23/38, 289 yards, 2 TD
- CLE – Jameis Winston – 27/41, 341 yards, 3 TD

**Top rushers**

- BAL – Derrick Henry – 11 rushes, 73 yards, TD
- CLE – Nick Chubb – 16 rushes, 52 yards

**Top receivers**

- BAL – Zay Flowers – 7 receptions, 115 yards
- CLE – Cedric Tillman – 7 receptions, 99 yards, 2 TD

Despite being heavy favorites, the Ravens struggled and were ultimately stunned by the Browns 24–29. The Ravens offense was inconsistent throughout the game and had at least three drops. Meanwhile, the Ravens defense, who were missing multiple key starters, was repeatedly gashed by Jameis Winston and also dropped several potential interceptions. They also were unable to close out the game. Despite struggling and trailing for most of the game, the Ravens were able to take a 24–23 lead on a Derrick Henry touchdown run with 2:36 left in regulation. The Browns then drove into Baltimore territory, but with 1:04 left in the game, Winston overthrew Elijah Moore on a deep ball that went straight to Kyle Hamilton. However, Hamilton dropped it and Winston threw a go-ahead 38-yard touchdown pass to Cedric Tillman on the very next play. Baltimore tried to rally back, but turned the ball over on downs at the Cleveland 24-yard line as time expired. The loss snapped the Ravens five-game winning streak, dropping their record to 5–3.

==== Week 9: Baltimore Ravens 41, Denver Broncos 10 ====
Week 9: Denver Broncos at Baltimore Ravens – Game summary

Quarter	1	2	3	4	Total
Broncos	0	10	0	0	**10**
**Ravens**	7	17	14	3	**41**

at M&T Bank Stadium, Baltimore, Maryland

- Date: November 3
- Game time: 1:00 p.m. EST
- Game weather: Clear, 57 °F (14 °C)
- Game attendance: 71,051
- Referee: Adrian Hill
- TV announcers (CBS): Jim Nantz, Tony Romo and Tracy Wolfson
- Recap, Game Book

Game information

**First quarter**

- BAL – Derrick Henry 7-yard run (Justin Tucker kick), 2:18. Ravens 7–0. **Drive: 7 plays, 57 yards, 3:59.**

**Second quarter**

- BAL – Justin Tucker 33-yard field goal, 12:04. Ravens 10–0. **Drive: 5 plays, 52 yards, 2:21.**
- DEN – Bo Nix 2-yard pass from Courtland Sutton (Wil Lutz kick), 7:15. Ravens 10–7. **Drive: 11 plays, 70 yards, 4:49.**
- BAL – Zay Flowers 7-yard pass from Lamar Jackson (Justin Tucker kick), 3:47. Ravens 17–7. **Drive: 7 plays, 63 yards, 3:28.**
- DEN – Wil Lutz 37-yard field goal, 0:54. Ravens 17–10. **Drive: 11 plays, 51 yards, 2:53.**
- BAL – Zay Flowers 53-yard pass from Lamar Jackson (Justin Tucker kick), 0:16. Ravens 24–10. **Drive: 2 plays, 70 yards, 0:38.**

**Third quarter**

- BAL – Derrick Henry 6-yard run (Justin Tucker kick), 9:36. Ravens 31–10. **Drive: 10 plays, 70 yards, 5:24.**
- BAL – Patrick Ricard 3-yard pass from Lamar Jackson (Justin Tucker kick), 1:21. Ravens 38–10. **Drive: 10 plays, 79 yards, 6:11.**

**Fourth quarter**

- BAL – Justin Tucker 37-yard field goal, 12:49. Ravens 41–10. **Drive: 5 plays, 20 yards, 2:15.**

**Top passers**

- DEN – Bo Nix – 17/33, 188 yards, INT
- BAL – Lamar Jackson – 16/19, 280 yards, 3 TD

**Top rushers**

- DEN – Javonte Williams – 12 rushes, 42 yards
- BAL – Derrick Henry – 23 rushes, 106 yards, 2 TD

**Top receivers**

- DEN – Courtland Sutton – 7 receptions, 122 yards
- BAL – Zay Flowers – 5 receptions, 127 yards, 2 TD

QB Lamar Jackson recorded his 4th career perfect-passer rating, tying him for the most all time, in a 41–10 blowout against the number 3 defense in the league. With the win, the Ravens improved to 6–3.

==== Week 10: Baltimore Ravens 35, Cincinnati Bengals 34 ====
Week 10: Cincinnati Bengals at Baltimore Ravens – Game summary

Quarter	1	2	3	4	Total
Bengals	7	7	7	13	**34**
**Ravens**	0	7	7	21	**35**

at M&T Bank Stadium, Baltimore, Maryland

- Date: November 7
- Game time: 8:15 p.m. EST
- Game weather: Clear, 69 °F (21 °C)
- Game attendance: 71,439
- Referee: Clete Blakeman
- TV announcers (WMAR/Amazon Prime): Al Michaels, Kirk Herbstreit and Kaylee Hartung
  Game exclusive to WMAR through syndication. Out of market on Prime Video.
- Recap, Game Book

Game information

**First quarter**

- CIN – Chase Brown 1-yard run (Evan McPherson kick), 9:23. Bengals 7–0. **Drive: 12 plays, 70 yards, 5:37.**

**Second quarter**

- BAL – Nelson Agholor 6-yard pass from Lamar Jackson (Justin Tucker kick), 13:04. Tied 7–7. **Drive: 9 plays, 59 yards, 4:52.**
- CIN – Tanner Hudson 3-yard pass from Joe Burrow (Evan McPherson kick), 0:30. Bengals 14–7. **Drive: 10 plays, 73 yards, 3:32.**

**Third quarter**

- CIN – Ja'Marr Chase 67-yard pass from Joe Burrow (Evan McPherson kick), 13:09. Bengals 21–7. **Drive: 1 play, 67 yards, 0:12.**
- BAL – Derrick Henry 1-yard run (Justin Tucker kick), 4:12. Bengals 21–14. **Drive: 5 plays, 31 yards, 2:46.**

**Fourth quarter**

- BAL – Tylan Wallace 84-yard pass from Lamar Jackson (kick failed, wide left), 13:30. Bengals 21–20. **Drive: 3 plays, 92 yards, 1:14.**
- BAL – Mark Andrews 18-yard pass from Lamar Jackson (Lamar Jackson run), 5:50. Ravens 28–21. **Drive: 7 plays, 65 yards, 3:34.**
- CIN – Ja'Marr Chase 70-yard pass from Joe Burrow (Evan McPherson kick), 5:37. Tied 28–28. **Drive: 1 play, 70 yards, 0:13.**
- BAL – Rashod Bateman 5-yard pass from Lamar Jackson (Justin Tucker kick), 1:49. Ravens 35–28. **Drive: 11 plays, 70 yards, 3:48.**
- CIN – Ja'Marr Chase 5-yard pass from Joe Burrow (pass failed), 0:38. Ravens 35–34. **Drive: 9 plays, 70 yards, 1:11.**

**Top passers**

- CIN – Joe Burrow – 34/56, 428 yards, 4 TD
- BAL – Lamar Jackson – 25/33, 290 yards, 4 TD

**Top rushers**

- CIN – Chase Brown – 13 rushes, 42 yards, TD
- BAL – Derrick Henry – 16 rushes, 68 yards, TD

**Top receivers**

- CIN – Ja'Marr Chase – 11 receptions, 264 yards, 3 TDz
- BAL – Tylan Wallace – 3 receptions, 115 yards, TD

The Ravens swept the Bengals for the second year in a row with a 35–34 win. With the win, the Ravens improved to 7–3. QB Lamar Jackson had the best fourth quarter performance of his career, throwing for 197 yards, three touchdowns, and a perfect passer rating in the final quarter as he rallied the Ravens from a 14-point deficit. He also became the only player in NFL history with five touchdown passes and no interceptions in the fourth quarter against an opponent in a single season.

==== Week 11: Pittsburgh Steelers 18, Baltimore Ravens 16 ====
Week 11: Baltimore Ravens at Pittsburgh Steelers – Game summary

Quarter	1	2	3	4	Total
Ravens	0	7	3	6	**16**
**Steelers**	3	6	6	3	**18**

at Acrisure Stadium, Pittsburgh, Pennsylvania

- Date: November 17
- Game time: 1:00 p.m. EST
- Game weather: Cloudy, 52 °F (11 °C)
- Game attendance: 67,551
- Referee: Clay Martin
- TV announcers (CBS): Ian Eagle, Charles Davis and Evan Washburn
- Recap, Game Book

Game information

**First quarter**

- PIT – Chris Boswell 32-yard field goal, 10:40. Steelers 3–0. **Drive: 8 plays, 28 yards, 3:31.**

**Second quarter**

- PIT – Chris Boswell 52-yard field goal, 7:39. Steelers 6–0. **Drive: 10 plays, 50 yards, 4:52.**
- BAL – Derrick Henry 1-yard run (Justin Tucker kick), 1:16. Ravens 7–6. **Drive: 6 plays, 80 yards, 3:51.**
- PIT – Chris Boswell 32-yard field goal, 0:07. Steelers 9–7. **Drive: 4 plays, 5 yards, 0:22.**

**Third quarter**

- PIT – Chris Boswell 57-yard field goal, 10:46. Steelers 12–7. **Drive: 8 plays, 31 yards, 4:14.**
- BAL – Justin Tucker 54-yard field goal, 6:12. Steelers 12–10. **Drive: 11 plays, 34 yards, 4:34.**
- PIT – Chris Boswell 27-yard field goal, 0:56. Steelers 15–10. **Drive: 10 plays, 61 yards, 5:16.**

**Fourth quarter**

- PIT – Chris Boswell 50-yard field goal, 3:35. Steelers 18–10. **Drive: 9 plays, 32 yards, 4:39.**
- BAL – Zay Flowers 16-yard pass from Lamar Jackson (pass failed), 1:06. Steelers 18–16. **Drive: 9 plays, 69 yards, 2:29.**

**Top passers**

- BAL – Lamar Jackson – 16/33, 207 yards, TD, INT
- PIT – Russell Wilson – 23/36, 205 yards, INT

**Top rushers**

- BAL – Derrick Henry – 13 rushes, 65 yards, TD
- PIT – Najee Harris – 18 rushes, 63 yards

**Top receivers**

- BAL – Isaiah Likely – 4 receptions, 75 yards
- PIT – George Pickens – 8 receptions, 89 yards

The Ravens lost their fourth consecutive game against the Steelers, dropping their record to 7–4 and giving the Steelers control of the AFC North.

==== Week 12: Baltimore Ravens 30, Los Angeles Chargers 23 ====
Week 12: Baltimore Ravens at Los Angeles Chargers – Game summary

Quarter	1	2	3	4	Total
**Ravens**	0	14	3	13	**30**
Chargers	7	6	3	7	**23**

at SoFi Stadium, Inglewood, California

- Date: November 25
- Game time: 8:15 p.m. EST/5:15 p.m. PST
- Game weather: Clear, 61 °F (16 °C)
- Game attendance: 70,240
- Referee: Carl Cheffers
- TV announcers (ESPN/ABC/ESPN+): Joe Buck, Troy Aikman, Lisa Salters and Laura Rutledge
- Recap, Game Book

Game information

**First quarter**

- LAC – Justin Herbert 5-yard run (Cameron Dicker kick), 9:45. Chargers 7–0. **Drive: 9 plays, 70 yards, 5:15.**

**Second quarter**

- LAC – Cameron Dicker 42-yard field goal, 11:26. Chargers 10–0. **Drive: 11 plays, 40 yards, 5:33.**
- BAL – Lamar Jackson 10-yard run (Justin Tucker kick), 7:48. Chargers 10–7. **Drive: 7 plays, 70 yards, 3:38.**
- BAL – Rashod Bateman 40-yard pass from Lamar Jackson (Justin Tucker kick), 0:24. Ravens 14–10. **Drive: 8 plays, 93 yards, 3:30.**
- LAC – Cameron Dicker 52-yard field goal, 0:00. Ravens 14–13. **Drive: 5 plays, 36 yards, 0:24.**

**Third quarter**

- BAL – Justin Tucker 45-yard field goal, 9:29. Ravens 17–13. **Drive: 10 plays, 43 yards, 5:31.**
- LAC – Cameron Dicker 52-yard field goal, 4:08. Ravens 17–16. **Drive: 10 plays, 36 yards, 5:21.**

**Fourth quarter**

- BAL – Mark Andrews 6-yard pass from Lamar Jackson (pass failed), 12:32. Ravens 23–16. **Drive: 14 plays, 70 yards, 6:36.**
- BAL – Justice Hill 51-yard run (Justin Tucker kick), 7:24. Ravens 30–16. **Drive: 6 plays, 72 yards, 3:21.**
- LAC – Gus Edwards 1-yard run (Cameron Dicker kick), 0:46. Ravens 30–23. **Drive: 11 plays, 63 yards, 2:22.**

**Top passers**

- BAL – Lamar Jackson – 16/22, 177 yards, 2 TD
- LAC – Justin Herbert – 21/36, 218 yards

**Top rushers**

- BAL – Derrick Henry – 24 rushes, 140 yards
- LAC – J. K. Dobbins – 6 rushes, 40 yards

**Top receivers**

- BAL – Zay Flowers – 5 receptions, 62 yards
- LAC – Ladd McConkey – 6 receptions, 83 yards

Despite falling behind 10–0 early, the Ravens were able to rally and defeat the Chargers 30–23. With the win, the Ravens improved to 8–4.

==== Week 13: Philadelphia Eagles 24, Baltimore Ravens 19 ====
Week 13: Philadelphia Eagles at Baltimore Ravens – Game summary

Quarter	1	2	3	4	Total
**Eagles**	0	14	0	10	**24**
Ravens	9	3	0	7	**19**

at M&T Bank Stadium, Baltimore, Maryland

- Date: December 1, 2024
- Game time: 4:25 p.m. EST
- Game weather: Cloudy, 41 °F (5 °C)
- Game attendance: 71,344
- Referee: Craig Wrolstad
- TV announcers (CBS): Jim Nantz, Tony Romo and Tracy Wolfson
- Recap, Game Book

Game information

**First quarter**

- BAL – Justin Tucker 34-yard field goal, 9:21. Ravens 3–0. **Drive: 7 plays, 51 yards, 3:49.**
- BAL – Mark Andrews 14-yard pass from Lamar Jackson (kick failed, hit left upright), 3:49. Ravens 9–0. **Drive: 8 plays, 82 yards, 4:38.**

**Second quarter**

- PHI – Dallas Goedert 17-yard pass from Jalen Hurts (Jake Elliott kick), 8:04. Ravens 9–7. **Drive: 6 plays, 49 yards, 2:51.**
- PHI – Jalen Hurts 1-yard run (Jake Elliott kick), 2:00. Eagles 14–9. **Drive: 9 plays, 68 yards, 4:02.**
- BAL – Justin Tucker 50-yard field goal, 0:03. Eagles 14–12. **Drive: 8 plays, 27 yards, 1:57.**

**Third quarter**

- No scoring plays.

**Fourth quarter**

- PHI – Saquon Barkley 25-yard run (Jake Elliott kick), 7:56. Eagles 21–12. **Drive: 7 plays, 71 yards, 3:24.**
- PHI – Jake Elliott 35-yard field goal, 1:03. Eagles 24–12. **Drive: 11 plays, 25 yards, 5:08.**
- BAL – Isaiah Likely 11-yard pass from Lamar Jackson (Justin Tucker kick), 0:03. Eagles 24–19. **Drive: 7 plays, 70 yards, 1:00.**

**Top passers**

- PHI – Jalen Hurts – 11/19, 118 yards, TD
- BAL – Lamar Jackson – 23/36, 237 yards, 2 TD

**Top rushers**

- PHI – Saquon Barkley – 23 rushes, 107 yards, TD
- BAL – Derrick Henry – 19 rushes, 82 yards

**Top receivers**

- PHI – A. J. Brown – 5 receptions, 66 yards
- BAL – Zay Flowers – 3 receptions, 74 yards

In their last game before the bye week, the Ravens lost to the Eagles at home for the first time in franchise history. Lamar Jackson also suffered just his second loss against the NFC as a starter, and his first since 2022 against the New York Giants. Kicker Justin Tucker missed the extra point on Baltimore's first touchdown, as well as two crucial second-half field goal attempts, contributing to the Ravens' loss.

==== Week 15: Baltimore Ravens 35, New York Giants 14 ====
Week 15: Baltimore Ravens at New York Giants – Game summary

Quarter	1	2	3	4	Total
**Ravens**	7	14	7	7	**35**
Giants	0	7	0	7	**14**

at MetLife Stadium, East Rutherford, New Jersey

- Date: December 15, 2024
- Game time: 1:00 p.m. EST
- Game weather: Fair, 36 °F (2 °C)
- Game attendance: 77,455
- Referee: Brad Allen
- TV announcers (CBS): Andrew Catalon, Tiki Barber, Jason McCourty and A.J. Ross
- Recap, Game Book

Game information

**First quarter**

- BAL – Mark Andrews 13-yard pass from Lamar Jackson (Justin Tucker kick), 3:18. Ravens 7–0. **Drive: 6 plays, 33 yards, 3:29.**

**Second quarter**

- BAL – Rashod Bateman 49-yard pass from Lamar Jackson (Justin Tucker kick), 10:53. Ravens 14–0. **Drive: 5 plays, 70 yards, 2:55.**
- NYG – Devin Singletary 2-yard run (Graham Gano kick), 2:15. Ravens 14–7. **Drive: 13 plays, 80 yards, 8:38.**
- BAL – Rashod Bateman 20-yard pass from Lamar Jackson (Justin Tucker kick), 0:32. Ravens 21–7. **Drive: 9 plays, 80 yards, 1:43.**

**Third quarter**

- BAL – Devontez Walker 21-yard pass from Lamar Jackson (Justin Tucker kick), 4:01. Ravens 28–7. **Drive: 12 plays, 86 yards, 6:38.**

**Fourth quarter**

- BAL – Justice Hill 27-yard pass from Lamar Jackson (Justin Tucker kick), 10:46. Ravens 35–7. **Drive: 9 plays, 97 yards, 4:07.**
- NYG – Malik Nabers 9-yard pass from Tim Boyle (Graham Gano kick), 6:36. Ravens 35–14. **Drive: 10 plays, 70 yards, 4:10.**

**Top passers**

- BAL – Lamar Jackson – 21/25, 290 yards, 5 TD
- NYG – Tim Boyle – 12/24, 123 yards, TD, INT

**Top rushers**

- BAL – Derrick Henry – 14 rushes, 67 yards
- NYG – Tyrone Tracy Jr. – 10 rushes, 31 yards

**Top receivers**

- BAL – Rashod Bateman – 3 receptions, 80 yards, 2 TD
- NYG – Malik Nabers – 10 receptions, 82 yards, TD

The Ravens recorded their first win over the Giants in New Jersey since 1997.

==== Week 16: Baltimore Ravens 34, Pittsburgh Steelers 17 ====
Week 16: Pittsburgh Steelers at Baltimore Ravens – Game summary

Quarter	1	2	3	4	Total
Steelers	0	10	7	0	**17**
**Ravens**	7	10	7	10	**34**

at M&T Bank Stadium, Baltimore, Maryland

- Date: December 21
- Game time: 4:30 p.m. EST
- Game weather: Cloudy, 35 °F (2 °C)
- Game attendance: 71,313
- Referee: Bill Vinovich
- TV announcers (Fox): Kevin Burkhardt, Tom Brady, Erin Andrews and Tom Rinaldi
- Recap, Game Book

Game information

**First quarter**

- BAL – Isaiah Likely 9-yard pass from Lamar Jackson (Justin Tucker kick), 3:49. Ravens 7–0. **Drive: 6 plays, 41 yards, 3:08.**

**Second quarter**

- PIT – MyCole Pruitt 1-yard pass from Russell Wilson (Chris Boswell kick), 14:56. Tied 7–7. **Drive: 10 plays, 73 yards, 5:56.**
- BAL – Rashod Bateman 14-yard pass from Lamar Jackson (Justin Tucker kick), 7:28. Ravens 14–7. **Drive: 8 plays, 96 yards, 3:29.**
- BAL – Justin Tucker 51-yard field goal, 1:43. Ravens 17–7. **Drive: 10 plays, 39 yards, 4:14.**
- PIT – Chris Boswell 51-yard field goal, 0:00. Ravens 17–10. **Drive: 9 plays, 37 yards, 1:43.**

**Third quarter**

- PIT – Cordarrelle Patterson 12-yard pass from Russell Wilson (Chris Boswell kick), 5:14. Tied 17–17. **Drive: 8 plays, 88 yards, 4:38.**
- BAL – Mark Andrews 7-yard pass from Lamar Jackson (Justin Tucker kick), 15:09. Ravens 24–17. **Drive: 6 plays, 60 yards, 3:24.**

**Fourth quarter**

- BAL – Marlon Humphrey 37-yard interception return (Justin Tucker kick), 7:24. Ravens 31–17.
- BAL – Justin Tucker 23-yard field goal, 3:10. Ravens 34–17. **Drive: 11 plays, 86 yards, 6:09.**

**Top passers**

- PIT – Russell Wilson – 22/33, 217 yards, 2 TD, INT
- BAL – Lamar Jackson – 15/23, 207 yards, 3 TD, INT

**Top rushers**

- PIT – Jaylen Warren – 12 rushes, 48 yards
- BAL – Derrick Henry – 24 rushes, 162 yards

**Top receivers**

- PIT – Calvin Austin – 4 receptions, 65 yards
- BAL – Zay Flowers – 5 receptions, 100 yards

The Ravens clinched a playoff berth and snapped a four-game losing streak to the Steelers with a 34–17 home win. Lamar Jackson threw for 207 yards, 3 touchdowns, and an interception while also rushing for 22 yards. Derrick Henry had 189 scrimmage yards with 162 of them coming on the ground. The defense also forced two crucial turnovers. The first one came early in the second quarter with the game tied at 7 when Ar'Darius Washington forced a Russell Wilson fumble after the latter had scrambled 19 yards to the Baltimore 4 yard line. The fumble was recovered by Kyle Van Noy and the Ravens drove 96 yards and scored a touchdown to take a 14–7 lead. The second turnover came after Jackson had thrown a red zone interception early in the fourth quarter with the Ravens up 24–17. After being pressured by David Ojabo, Wilson threw a pass that was behind his intended receiver MyCole Pruitt. The pass was intercepted and returned 37 yards for a touchdown by Marlon Humphrey, allowing the Ravens to extend their lead to 31–17. After forcing a Steelers punt, the Ravens drove 86 yards in 11 plays while running 6:09 of the remaining 9:19 off the clock. The drive ended in a field goal, effectively icing the game. With the win, the Ravens improved to 10–5, denied the Steelers the AFC North crown, and tied with the Steelers atop the AFC North, though the Steelers had the tiebreaker based on conference record and would have clinched the division had Baltimore lost this game.

==== Week 17: Baltimore Ravens 31, Houston Texans 2 ====
Christmas Day games

Week 17: Baltimore Ravens at Houston Texans – Game summary

Quarter	1	2	3	4	Total
**Ravens**	10	7	14	0	**31**
Texans	0	2	0	0	**2**

at NRG Stadium, Houston, Texas

- Date: December 25
- Game time: 4:30 p.m. EST/3:30 p.m. CST
- Game weather: None (retractable roof closed)
- Game attendance: 71,544
- Referee: Alan Eck
- TV announcers (WJZ, KHOU): Noah Eagle, Greg Olsen, Jamie Erdahl and Steve Wyche
  Game exclusive to KHOU and WJZ. Out of market on Netflix.
- Recap, Game Book

Game information

**First quarter**

- BAL – Derrick Henry 2-yard run (Justin Tucker kick), 10:08. Ravens 7–0. **Drive: 8 plays, 75 yards, 4:52.**
- BAL – Justin Tucker 52-yard field goal, 2:47. Ravens 10–0. **Drive: 7 plays, 36 yards, 3:25.**

**Second quarter**

- HOU – Derrick Henry tackled in the end zone by Kamari Lassiter for a safety, 10:09. Ravens 10–2.
- BAL – Isaiah Likely 9-yard pass from Lamar Jackson (Justin Tucker kick), 1:51. Ravens 17–2. **Drive: 6 plays, 99 yards, 3:40.**

**Third quarter**

- BAL – Lamar Jackson 48-yard run (Justin Tucker kick), 13:22. Ravens 24–2. **Drive: 2 plays, 61 yards, 0:44.**
- BAL – Mark Andrews 1-yard pass from Lamar Jackson (Justin Tucker kick), 5:50. Ravens 31–2. **Drive: 10 plays, 62 yards, 5:31.**

**Fourth quarter**

- No scoring plays.

**Top passers**

- BAL – Lamar Jackson – 10/15, 168 yards, 2 TD
- HOU – C. J. Stroud – 17/31, 185 yards, INT

**Top rushers**

- BAL – Derrick Henry – 27 rushes, 147 yards, TD
- HOU – Joe Mixon – 9 rushes, 26 yards

**Top receivers**

- BAL – Mark Andrews – 2 receptions, 68 yards, TD
- HOU – Nico Collins – 3 receptions, 59 yards

Assisted by Pittsburgh's loss to Kansas City earlier that day, the Ravens took control of the AFC North with a 31–2 road rout of the Texans. The Ravens defense pitched a shutout while the Houston defense had no answers for Baltimore's run game. Lamar Jackson had 168 yards passing and two touchdowns while adding 87 yards rushing and another touchdown. Jackson also broke Michael Vick’s record for the most rushing yards by a quarterback in NFL history. Derrick Henry had 165 scrimmage yards and a rushing touchdown as the Ravens finished with more rushing yards (251) than the Texans had total yards of offense (211). Houston's only score came on a safety when Kamari Lassiter tackled Henry in the end zone for a four yard loss in the second quarter to make it 10–2. However, the Texans turned the ball over on downs at the Baltimore 1-yard line on their next drive and the Ravens drove 99 yards for a touchdown on the ensuing drive. The Texans would reach the redzone only one other time on a late third quarter drive that also ended in a turnover on downs. With the win, the Ravens improved to 11–5.

==== Week 18: Baltimore Ravens 35, Cleveland Browns 10 ====
Week 18: Cleveland Browns at Baltimore Ravens – Game summary

Quarter	1	2	3	4	Total
Browns	0	3	0	7	**10**
**Ravens**	7	7	7	14	**35**

at M&T Bank Stadium, Baltimore, Maryland

- Date: January 4
- Game time: 4:30 p.m. EST
- Game weather: Clear, 31 °F (−1 °C)
- Game attendance: 70,562
- Referee: Scott Novak
- TV announcers (ESPN/ABC/ESPN+): Chris Fowler, Louis Riddick, Dan Orlovsky and Laura Rutledge
- Recap, Game Book

Game information

**First quarter**

- BAL – Nate Wiggins 26-yard interception return (Justin Tucker kick), 8:32. Ravens 7–0.

**Second quarter**

- BAL – Mark Andrews 12-yard pass from Lamar Jackson (Justin Tucker kick), 11:03. Ravens 14–0. **Drive: 7 plays, 47 yards, 3:18.**
- CLE – Dustin Hopkins 23-yard field goal, 6:33. Ravens 14–3. **Drive: 9 plays, 55 yards, 4:30.**

**Third quarter**

- BAL – Rashod Bateman 7-yard pass from Lamar Jackson (Justin Tucker kick), 10:42. Ravens 21–3. **Drive: 7 plays, 70 yards, 4:18.**

**Fourth quarter**

- CLE – Jordan Atkins 16-yard pass from Bailey Zappe (Dustin Hopkins kick), 11:33. Ravens 21–10. **Drive: 12 plays, 72 yards, 6:36.**
- BAL – Derrick Henry 2-yard run (Justin Tucker kick), 6:44. Ravens 28–10. **Drive: 8 plays, 70 yards, 4:49.**
- BAL – Derrick Henry 43-yard run (Justin Tucker kick), 3:04. Ravens 35–10. **Drive: 3 plays, 51 yards, 1:31.**

**Top passers**

- CLE – Bailey Zappe – 16/31, 170 yards, TD, 2 INT
- BAL – Lamar Jackson – 16/32, 217 yards, 2 TD

**Top rushers**

- CLE – D'Onta Foreman – 10 rushes, 27 yards
- BAL – Derrick Henry – 20 rushes, 138 yards, 2 TD

**Top receivers**

- CLE – Jordan Atkins – 6 receptions, 60 yards, TD
- BAL – Rashod Bateman – 5 receptions, 76 yards, TD

Derrick Henry broke the Ravens' record for most rushing touchdowns in a single season as the Ravens trounced the Browns 35–10 to clinch the AFC North and the AFC's No. 3 seed despite losing pro bowler Zay Flowers to injury. Henry rushed for 165 yards and two touchdowns (both in the fourth quarter) to finish the season with 16 rushing touchdowns. The previous record was 15 by Jamal Lewis. The Ravens defense also recorded two interceptions off of Bailey Zappe: the first one was a pick-6 midway through the first quarter when Nate Wiggins returned an interception 26 yards for a touchdown to give the Ravens a 7–0 lead. The second one came with 2:25 left to go in the fourth quarter when Michael Pierce infamously intercepted a pass at the Baltimore 16 and returned it to the Baltimore 22 before sliding down. At 355 pounds, Pierce became the heaviest NFL player to record an interception since at least 2000. With the win, the Ravens finished the season at 12–5. Michael Pierce's interception has become an internet sensation.

== League rankings ==
As of Week 18:

Category	Total yards	Yards per game	NFL rank (out of 32)
Passing offense	4,189	246.4	8th
Rushing offense	3,189	187.5	1st
Total offense	7,378	434	1st
Passing defense	4,468	252.8	30th
Rushing defense	1,361	80	1st
Total defense	5,829	342.8	10th

Source: ProFootballReference.com

=== Team leaders ===
Category	Player(s)	Total
Passing yards	Lamar Jackson	4,172
Passing touchdowns	Lamar Jackson	41
Rushing yards	Derrick Henry	1,921
Rushing touchdowns	Derrick Henry	16
Receptions	Zay Flowers	74
Receiving yards	Zay Flowers	1,059
Receiving touchdowns	Mark Andrews	11
Points	Justin Tucker	126
Kickoff return yards	Chris Collier	221
Punt return yards	Deonte Harty	85
Tackles	Roquan Smith	78
Sacks	Kyle Van Noy	12.5
Interceptions	Marlon Humphrey	6
Forced fumbles	Tied (Note: Kyle Hamilton, Kyle Van Noy, Marlon Humphrey)	2

Source: Pro-Football-Reference.com

=== Standings ===
==== Division ====
AFC North
	W	L	T	PCT	DIV	CONF	PF	PA	STK
^{(3)} Baltimore Ravens	12	5	0	.706	4–2	8–4	518	361	W4
^{(6)} Pittsburgh Steelers	10	7	0	.588	3–3	7–5	380	347	L4
Cincinnati Bengals	9	8	0	.529	3–3	6–6	472	434	W5
Cleveland Browns	3	14	0	.176	2–4	3–9	258	435	L6

==== Conference ====
AFC
Seed	Team	Division	W	L	T	PCT	DIV	CONF	SOS	SOV	STK
Division leaders
1	Kansas City Chiefs	West	15	2	0	.882	5–1	10–2	.488	.463	L1
2	Buffalo Bills	East	13	4	0	.765	5–1	9–3	.467	.448	L1
3	Baltimore Ravens	North	12	5	0	.706	4–2	8–4	.529	.525	W4
4	Houston Texans	South	10	7	0	.588	5–1	8–4	.481	.376	W1
Wild cards
5	Los Angeles Chargers	West	11	6	0	.647	4–2	8–4	.467	.348	W3
6 (Note: Pittsburgh clinched the #6 seed over Denver based on head-to-head victory.)	Pittsburgh Steelers	North	10	7	0	.588	3–3	7–5	.502	.453	L4
7	Denver Broncos	West	10	7	0	.588	3–3	6–6	.502	.394	W1
Did not qualify for the postseason
8	Cincinnati Bengals	North	9	8	0	.529	3–3	6–6	.478	.314	W5
9 (Note: Indianapolis finished ahead of Miami based on head-to-head victory.)	Indianapolis Colts	South	8	9	0	.471	3–3	7–5	.457	.309	W1
10	Miami Dolphins	East	8	9	0	.471	3–3	6–6	.419	.294	L1
11	New York Jets	East	5	12	0	.294	2–4	5–7	.495	.341	W1
12 (Note: Jacksonville finished ahead of New England and Las Vegas based on conference record. (Jacksonville 4–8 to New England 3–9 to Las Vegas 3–9))	Jacksonville Jaguars	South	4	13	0	.235	3–3	4–8	.478	.265	L1
13 (Note: New England finished ahead of Las Vegas based on strength of victory. (New England .471 to Las Vegas .353))	New England Patriots	East	4	13	0	.235	2–4	3–9	.471	.471	W1
14	Las Vegas Raiders	West	4	13	0	.235	0–6	3–9	.540	.353	L1
15 (Note: Cleveland finished ahead of Tennessee based on strength of victory. (Cleveland .510 to Tennessee .431))	Cleveland Browns	North	3	14	0	.176	2–4	3–9	.536	.510	L6
16	Tennessee Titans	South	3	14	0	.176	1–5	3–9	.522	.431	L6
Tiebreakers (Note: When breaking ties for three or more teams under the NFL's rules, they are first broken within divisions, then comparing only the highest ranked remaining team from each division.)

== Postseason ==
=== Schedule ===
Round	Date	Opponent (seed)	Result	Record	Venue	Recap
Wild Card	January 11	Pittsburgh Steelers (6)	W 28–14	1–0	M&T Bank Stadium	Recap
Divisional	January 19	at Buffalo Bills (2)	L 25–27	1–1	Highmark Stadium	Recap

=== Game summaries ===
==== AFC Wild Card Playoffs: vs. (6) Pittsburgh Steelers ====
AFC Wild Card Playoffs: (6) Pittsburgh Steelers at (3) Baltimore Ravens – Game summary

Quarter	1	2	3	4	Total
Steelers	0	0	14	0	14
Ravens	7	14	7	0	28

at M&T Bank Stadium, Baltimore, Maryland

- Date: January 11, 2025
- Game time: 8:00 p.m. EST
- Game weather: Clear, 32 °F (0 °C)
- Game attendance: 70,546
- Referee: Alex Kemp
- TV announcers (WMAR/WPXI): Al Michaels, Kirk Herbstreit and Kaylee Hartung
  Game exclusive to WMAR and WPXI. Out of market on Prime Video.
- Recap, Game Book

Game information

First quarter

- BAL – Rashod Bateman 15-yard pass from Lamar Jackson (Justin Tucker kick), 4:45. Ravens 7–0. Drive: 13 plays, 95 yards, 7:13.

Second quarter

- BAL – Derrick Henry 8-yard run (Justin Tucker kick), 4:09. Ravens 14–0. Drive: 13 plays, 85 yards, 7:56.
- BAL – Justice Hill 5-yard pass from Lamar Jackson (Justin Tucker kick), 0:02. Ravens 21–0. Drive: 9 plays, 90 yards, 1:51.

Third quarter

- PIT – Van Jefferson 30-yard pass from Russell Wilson (Chris Boswell kick), 8:05. Ravens 21–7. Drive: 9 plays, 98 yards, 3:24.
- BAL – Derrick Henry 44-yard run (Justin Tucker kick), 5:49. Ravens 28–7. Drive: 4 plays, 70 yards, 2:16.
- PIT – George Pickens 36-yard pass from Russell Wilson (Chris Boswell kick), 3:24. Ravens 28–14. Drive: 5 plays, 70 yards, 2:25.

Fourth quarter

- No scoring plays

Top passers

- PIT – Russell Wilson – 20/29, 270 yards, 2 TD
- BAL – Lamar Jackson – 16/21, 175 yards, 2 TD

Top rushers

- PIT – Najee Harris – 6 rushes, 17 yards
- BAL – Derrick Henry – 26 rushes, 186 yards, 2 TD

Top receivers

- PIT – George Pickens – 5 receptions, 87 yards, TD
- BAL – Isaiah Likely – 3 receptions, 53 yards

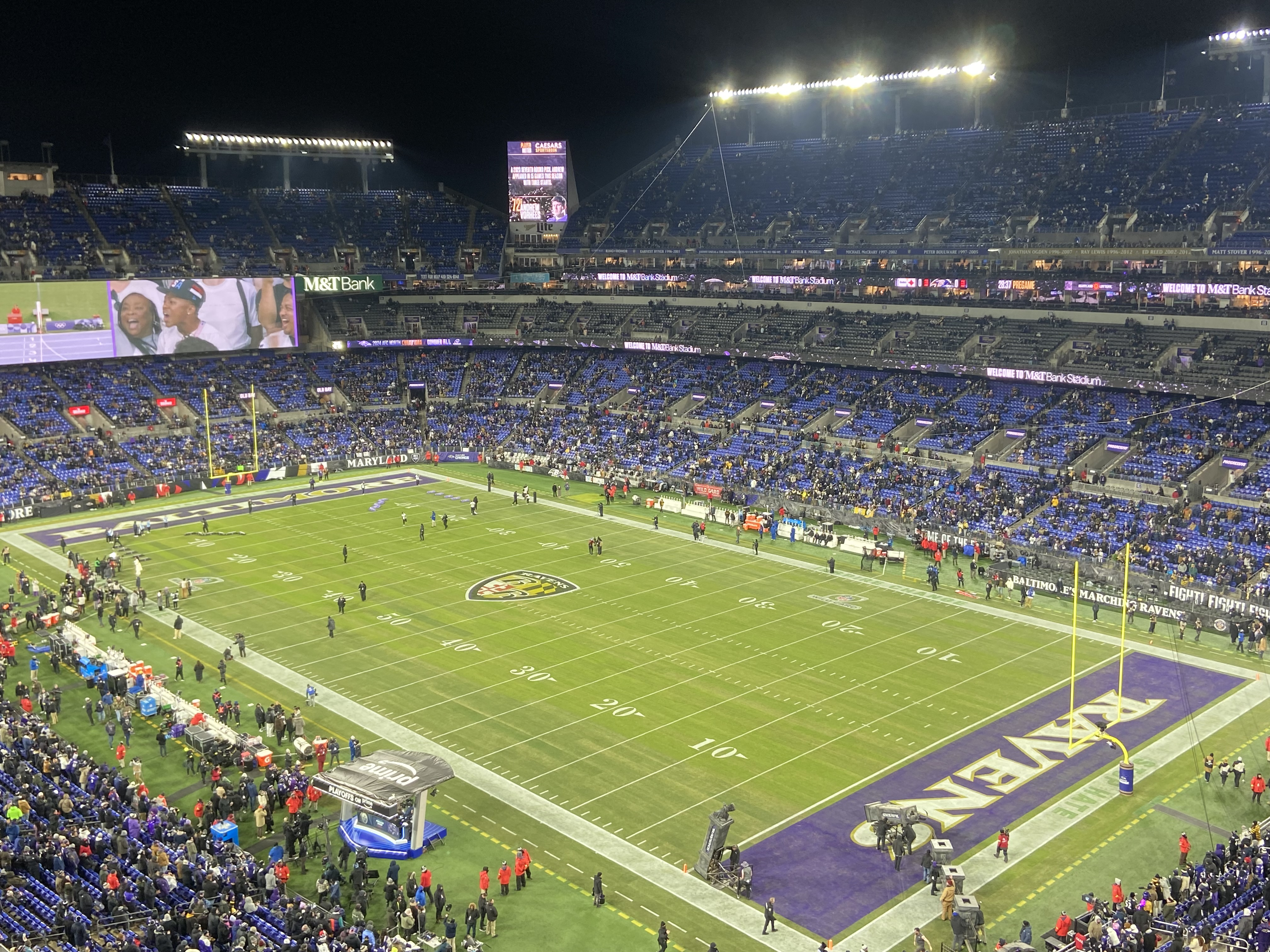
M&T Bank Stadium prior to the start of the game.

This was the fifth playoff meeting between the Steelers and the Ravens, and the first held in Baltimore. The Steelers lead 3–1 all time in playoff meetings against the Ravens heading into this game, all of which were previously played in Pittsburgh. Their most recent playoff meeting came in the 2014 AFC Wild Card round, where the Ravens defeated the Steelers 30–17. In the regular season, the Ravens and Steelers split the series, with the Steelers winning 18–16 in Pittsburgh during Week 11, and the Ravens winning 34–17 in Baltimore during Week 16.

After forcing a punt on the Steelers first offensive possession, the Ravens drove 95 yards on their opening drive that ended with Lamar Jackson hitting Rashod Bateman for a 15-yard touchdown to go up 7-0 and take a lead the Ravens never surrendered. The Ravens held a 21-0 score at halftime. Despite the Steelers eventually pulling within two scores in the third quarter, the fourth quarter went scoreless and the Ravens held on to defeat the Steelers 28–14.

Jackson completed 16 of 21 passes for 175 yards and two touchdowns, while also rushing for 81 yards. Derrick Henry set a Ravens franchise record for rushing yards in a postseason game by rushing for 186 yards and two touchdowns. The Ravens amassed 299 total rushing yards.

==== AFC Divisional Playoffs: at (2) Buffalo Bills ====
Divisional Round: (3) Baltimore Ravens at (2) Buffalo Bills – Game summary

Quarter	1	2	3	4	Total
Ravens	7	3	9	6	25
Bills	7	14	0	6	27

at Highmark Stadium, Orchard Park, New York

- Date: January 19, 2025
- Game time: 6:30 p.m. EST
- Game weather: Cloudy, 19 °F (−7 °C)
- Game attendance: 70,697
- Referee: Carl Cheffers
- TV announcers (CBS): Jim Nantz, Tony Romo, Tracy Wolfson and Jay Feely
- Recap, Game Book

Game information

First quarter

- BAL – Rashod Bateman 16-yard pass from Lamar Jackson (Justin Tucker kick), 10:40. Ravens 7–0. Drive: 8 plays, 73 yards, 4:20.
- BUF – Ray Davis 1-yard run (Tyler Bass kick), 4:43. Tied 7–7. Drive: 11 plays, 70 yards, 5:57.

Second quarter

- BUF – Josh Allen 1-yard run (Tyler Bass kick), 8:52. Bills 14–7. Drive: 4 plays, 24 yards, 2:13.
- BAL – Justin Tucker 26-yard field goal, 3:43. Bills 14–10. Drive: 9 plays, 57 yards, 5:09.
- BUF – Josh Allen 4-yard run (Tyler Bass kick), 0:16. Bills 21–10. Drive: 9 plays, 70 yards, 3:27.

Third quarter

- BAL – Justin Tucker 47-yard field goal, 9:47. Bills 21–13. Drive: 9 plays, 35 yards, 4:01.
- BAL – Derrick Henry 5-yard run (pass failed), 1:37. Bills 21–19. Drive: 7 plays, 80 yards, 3:44.

Fourth quarter

- BUF – Tyler Bass 51-yard field goal, 12:04. Bills 24–19. Drive: 10 plays, 37 yards, 4:33.
- BUF – Tyler Bass 21-yard field goal, 3:29. Bills 27–19. Drive: 11 plays, 52 yards, 5:12.
- BAL – Isaiah Likely 24-yard pass from Lamar Jackson (pass failed), 1:33. Bills 27–25. Drive: 8 plays, 88 yards, 1:56.

Top passers

- BAL – Lamar Jackson – 18/25, 254 yards, 2 TD, INT
- BUF – Josh Allen – 16/22, 127 yards

Top rushers

- BAL – Derrick Henry – 16 rushes, 84 yards, TD
- BUF – James Cook – 17 rushes, 67 yards

Top receivers

- BAL – Isaiah Likely – 4 receptions, 73 yards, TD
- BUF – Khalil Shakir – 6 receptions, 67 yards

This was the second meeting between the Bills and the Ravens in the playoffs, their previous meeting being during the 2020 AFC Divisional Round. In the regular season, the Ravens defeated the Bills 35-10 during Week 4 in Baltimore.

The Ravens would start off strong on their opening drive by capping off a 73-yard drive, ending with a Lamar Jackson 16-yard pass to Rashod Bateman to take an early 7–0 lead. However, the Bills would respond as they drove 70 yards down the field on their opening drive, finishing with a 1-yard run by Ray Davis for a touchdown to tie the score 7–7. Getting the ball back, the Ravens tried to follow up their previous touchdown but were stopped as Lamar Jackson threw an interception to safety Taylor Rapp. The Ravens would compensate for the turnover by forcing the Bills to punt as the Ravens would get the ball back, though they were backed up to their own 9-yard line.

Baltimore would end up driving the ball down 69 yards to the Bills' 28-yard line where Jackson would fumble the ball while being sacked by safety Damar Hamlin as Bills linebacker Von Miller recovered the fumble and would be tackled at the Ravens' 24-yard line. Buffalo would capitalize on the turnover following a 1-yard run by Josh Allen to put the Bills up 14–7. Attempting to answer, Baltimore would drive down 57 yards but were stopped on the Bills' 8-yard line, forcing a 26-yard field goal by Tucker to make the score 14–10. The Bills would then answer back with a 70-yard drive, ending with a 4-yard touchdown run by Allen to put the Bills up 21–10 at halftime.

Buffalo took the second-half kickoff but would go three-and-out as Baltimore forced a punt. Baltimore started at their own 36-yard line and drove down 35 yards settling for a Tucker 47-yard field goal to make the score 21–13. The Ravens' defense would step up and force a second punt, taking it to their own 20-yard line. Baltimore would capitalize on an 80-yard drive following a Derrick Henry 5-yard run for the touchdown to cut the deficit to 21–19. However, Baltimore would fail to convert the two-point conversion following a batted pass by Matt Milano. Buffalo would then respond in the 4th quarter following a 37-yard drive, ending in a 51-yard field goal by Bass to make the score 24–19. As Baltimore attempted to take the lead, the Bills would force their 3rd turnover of the game as linebacker Terrel Bernard punched the ball out of the arms of Mark Andrews forcing a fumble recovered by Bernard. The Bills would drive down the field to a 4th-and-goal on the Ravens' 3-yard line, settling for a 21-yard field goal by Bass as the Bills lead 27–19. Starting at their own 12-yard line, Jackson and the Ravens would drive down the field to the Bills 24-yard line and score a touchdown following a 24-yard pass from Jackson to Isaiah Likely to cut the lead to 27–25. On the two-point conversion, Jackson would throw the ball to Andrews who dropped the pass on the goal-line as Baltimore would fail to convert and tie the game. After failing to recover the onside kick, on top of many miscues by the Ravens, they would fall short and lose to the Bills 27–25 and were subsequently eliminated from the playoffs.

Jackson finished the game completing 18 of 25 passes for 2 touchdowns and an interception and lost fumble.

== Individual awards ==
=== Regular season ===
Recipient	Award(s)
Derrick Henry	Week 4: AFC Offensive Player of the Week; Week 4: FedEx Ground Player of the Week; Week 6: AFC Offensive Player of the Week; Week 10: NFLPA Community MVP
Lamar Jackson	Week 5: AFC Offensive Player of the Week; Week 7: AFC Offensive Player of the Week; Week 10: AFC Offensive Player of the Week; October: AFC Offensive Player of the Month
Kyle Van Noy	September: AFC Defensive Player of the Month
Nate Wiggins	Week 5: NFLPA Community MVP
