= List of Baltimore Ravens first-round draft picks =

The Baltimore Ravens joined the National Football League (NFL) in 1996 as a retroactive expansion team, after former Cleveland Browns owner Art Modell decided to relocate his team to Baltimore. The Browns were later reactivated in 1999. The Ravens' first selection as an NFL team was offensive tackle Jonathan Ogden from UCLA. The team's most recent first-round pick was offensive guard Vega Ioane from Penn State.

Every year during April, each NFL franchise seeks to add new players to its roster through a collegiate draft known as "the NFL Annual Player Selection Meeting", which is more commonly known as the NFL Draft. Teams are ranked in inverse order based on the previous season's record, with the worst record picking first, and the second worst picking second and so on. The two exceptions to this order are made for teams that appeared in the previous Super Bowl; the Super Bowl champion always picks 32nd, and the Super Bowl loser always picks 31st. Teams have the option of trading away their picks to other teams for different picks, players, cash, or a combination thereof. Thus, it is not uncommon for a team's actual draft pick to differ from their assigned draft pick, or for a team to have extra or no draft picks in any round due to these trades.

The Ravens have never selected the number one overall pick in the draft, but they have selected the fourth overall pick twice.

== Key ==
Table key
^	Indicates the player was inducted into the Pro Football Hall of Fame.
†	Indicates the player was selected for the Pro Bowl at any time in their career.
—	The Ravens did not draft a player in the first round that year.
Year	Each year links to an article about that particular NFL Draft.
Pick	Indicates the number of the pick within the first round
Position	Indicates the position of the player in the NFL
College	The player's college football team

== Player selections ==
Baltimore Ravens first-round draft picks
Year	Pick	Player name	Position	College	Notes
1996	4	Jonathan Ogden ^†	OT	UCLA	
1996	26	Ray Lewis ^†	MLB	Miami (FL)	
1997	4	Peter Boulware †	LB	Florida State	
1998	10	Duane Starks	CB	Miami (FL)	
1999	11	Chris McAlister †	CB	Arizona	
2000	5	Jamal Lewis †	RB	Tennessee	
2000	10	Travis Taylor	WR	Florida	
2001	31	Todd Heap †	TE	Arizona State	
2002	24	Ed Reed^†	S	Miami (FL)	
2003	10	Terrell Suggs †	OLB	Arizona State	
2003	19	Kyle Boller	QB	California	
2004	No pick				
2005	22	Mark Clayton	WR	Oklahoma	
2006	12	Haloti Ngata †	DT	Oregon	
2007	29	Ben Grubbs †	G	Auburn	
2008	18	Joe Flacco †	QB	Delaware	
2009	23	Michael Oher	OT	Ole Miss	
2010	No pick				
2011	27	Jimmy Smith	CB	Colorado	
2012	No pick				
2013	32	Matt Elam	S	Florida	
2014	17	C. J. Mosley †	LB	Alabama	
2015	26	Breshad Perriman	WR	UCF	
2016	6	Ronnie Stanley †	OT	Notre Dame	
2017	16	Marlon Humphrey †	CB	Alabama	
2018	25	Hayden Hurst	TE	South Carolina	
2018	32	Lamar Jackson †	QB	Louisville	
2019	25	Marquise Brown	WR	Oklahoma	
2020	28	Patrick Queen †	ILB	LSU	
2021	27	Rashod Bateman	WR	Minnesota	
2021	31	Odafe Oweh	OLB	Penn State	
2022	14	Kyle Hamilton †	S	Notre Dame	
2022	25	Tyler Linderbaum †	C	Iowa	
2023	22	Zay Flowers †	WR	Boston College	
2024	30	Nate Wiggins	CB	Clemson	
2025	27	Malaki Starks	S	Georgia	
2026	14	Vega Ioane	OG	Penn State	
