= George Warhop =

American football coach (born 1961)

Cleveland Browns
- Title: Offensive line coach

Personal information
- Born: September 19, 1961 (age 65); Riverside, California, U.S.

Career information
- Position: Center
- College: Cincinnati

Career history
- Cincinnati (1983) Student assistant; Kansas (1984–1986) Offensive line coach; Vanderbilt (1987–1989) Offensive line coach; New Mexico (1990) Offensive line coach; London Monarchs (1991–1992) Offensive coordinator; Southern Methodist (1993) Offensive line coach; Boston College (1994–1995) Offensive line coach; St. Louis Rams (1996–1997) Offensive line coach; Arizona Cardinals (1998–2002) Offensive line coach; Dallas Cowboys (2003–2004) Offensive line coach; San Francisco 49ers (2005–2008) Offensive line coach; Cleveland Browns (2009–2013) Offensive line coach; Tampa Bay Buccaneers (2014–2018) Offensive line coach; Jacksonville Jaguars (2019–2021) Offensive line coach; Houston Texans (2022) Offensive line coach; Baltimore Ravens (2024–2025) Offensive line coach; Cleveland Browns (2026–present) Offensive line coach

George Warhop (born September 19, 1961) is an American football coach who is the offensive line coach for the Cleveland Browns of the National Football League (NFL). He previously served as the offensive line coach for the Jacksonville Jaguars, Tampa Bay Buccaneers, Cleveland Browns, San Francisco 49ers, Dallas Cowboys, Arizona Cardinals, St. Louis Rams Houston Texans, and Baltimore Ravens.

== Coaching career ==
=== Early career ===
Warhop was named the offensive line coach of the Kansas Jayhawks on January 11, 1986. He was named the offensive line coach for Vanderbilt on February 21, 1989. After coaching the Commodores in 1989, Warhop resigned on December 13, 1989, and took the New Mexico offensive line coaching job on December 17, 1989. After coaching the Lobos in 1990, Warhop resigned and became the offensive coordinator for the London Monarchs of the World League of American Football. Warhop spent two seasons with the Monarchs before he was hired as the offensive line coach for Southern Methodist on February 17, 1993. He spent the summer of 1994 as a minority intern for the Denver Broncos of the National Football League. From 1994–1995 Warhop worked as the offensive line coach for Boston College.

=== St. Louis Rams ===
On February 8, 1996, Warhop was hired by the St. Louis Rams as their co-offensive line coach. In the 1997 NFL draft the Rams took offensive tackle Orlando Pace with the first overall selection. Pace held out of training camp for three weeks to get a bigger contract, and Warhop was angry, stating that Pace "lost a good part of the year." In an attempt to speed up the playbook-learning process, Warhop was assigned as a special tutor for Pace.

=== Arizona Cardinals ===
On February 10, 1998, Warhop was hired by the Arizona Cardinals as their offensive line coach. His contract expired at the conclusion of the 2002 season, and was not re-signed.

=== Dallas Cowboys ===
On January 16, 2003, Warhop was hired by the Dallas Cowboys as their offensive line coach, following his tenure with the Cardinals. In 2003 and 2004 the Cowboys' offensive line only allowed 37 sacks, while in 2002, the year before Warhop was hired, they surrendered 54 sacks. After two seasons with the Cowboys, Warhop was fired on January 7, 2005. Shortly after he was fired, he interviewed for the Florida State Seminoles' offensive line coach position, but did not get the job.

=== San Francisco 49ers ===
On January 27, 2005, Warhop was hired by the San Francisco 49ers as their offensive line coach. In 2006 Warhop's offensive line allowed a league-worst 55 sacks, and the 49ers hired a second offensive line coach, Chris Foerster, to share the duties. Warhop was fired in-season on October 23, 2008 after his offensive line gave up a league-worst 29 sacks to that point.

=== Cleveland Browns ===
On February 4, 2009, Warhop was hired by the Cleveland Browns as their offensive line coach under head coach Eric Mangini. He was retained as offensive line coach under head coaches Pat Shurmur and Rob Chudzinski.

=== Tampa Bay Buccaneers ===
In 2014, Warhop was hired by the Tampa Bay Buccaneers as their offensive line coach under head coach Lovie Smith. Warhop was retained under head coach Dirk Koetter.

=== Jacksonville Jaguars ===
On January 13, 2019, Warhop was hired by the Jacksonville Jaguars as their offensive line coach under head coach Doug Marrone. On January 19, 2021, Warhop was retained under the new head coach of the Jaguars, Urban Meyer.

=== Houston Texans ===
On February 21, 2022, Warhop was hired by the Houston Texans as their offensive line coach. He was not retained for the 2023 season.

=== Baltimore Ravens ===
On August 14, 2024, Warhop took over as interim offensive line coach following the hospitalization of Joe D'Alessandris. Following D'Alessandris's death on August 25, Warhop was named offensive line coach for the remainder of the season.

=== Cleveland Browns (second stint) ===
On January 28, 2026, Warhop rejoined the Cleveland Browns as the team's offensive line coach under new head coach Todd Monken.
