= George DeLeone =

American football coach (1948–2022)

Biographical details
- Born: May 9, 1948; New Haven, Connecticut, U.S.
- Died: March 1, 2022 (aged 73)

Coaching career (HC unless noted)
- 1970–1975: Southern Connecticut State (OL)
- 1976–1979: Southern Connecticut State
- 1980: Rutgers (DL)
- 1981–1982: Rutgers (DC/LB)
- 1983: Rutgers (ST/OL)
- 1984: Holy Cross (OC/OL)
- 1985–1986: Syracuse (OL)
- 1987–1996: Syracuse (OC/OL)
- 1997: San Diego Chargers (OL)
- 1998: Syracuse (assoc. HC/DC)
- 1999: Syracuse (assoc. HC/OC/QB)
- 2000–2004: Syracuse (assoc. HC/OC/OL)
- 2005: Ole Miss (RGC/OL)
- 2006: Temple (OC/QB)
- 2007: Temple (OC/OL)
- 2008–2010: Miami Dolphins (TE)
- 2011–2012: Connecticut (OC/TE)
- 2013: Connecticut (assoc. HC/OL)
- 2014: Cleveland Browns (assistant OL)
- 2015: Cleveland Browns (OL)
- 2016: Temple (OL)
- 2017: Baylor (OL)
- 2018–2019: Baylor (consultant)

Head coaching record
- Overall: 15–24

George DeLeone (May 9, 1948 – March 1, 2022) was an American football coach.

Prior to rejoining Temple's staff, where he was once the offensive coordinator from 2006 through 2007, DeLeone was an offensive line coach for the Cleveland Browns. DeLeone was once the head coach at Southern Connecticut State University (SCSU) from 1976 to 1979, where he compiled a record of 15 wins and 24 losses. DeLeone served in assistant coach & coordinator positions at Southern Connecticut, Rutgers, Holy Cross, Syracuse, Ole Miss, Temple, UConn, and Baylor.

He spent four years in the National Football League (NFL) with the San Diego Chargers and Miami Dolphins. He attended UConn and SCSU.

In 2021, DeLeone's son, Mark, became the linebackers coach of the Detroit Lions. Mark DeLeone has been a defensive assistant coach in college football and the NFL since 2007.

DeLeone died on March 1, 2022, at the age of 73.

== Head coaching record ==
Year	Team	Overall	Conference	Standing	Bowl/playoffs
Southern Connecticut State Owls (NCAA Division II independent) (1976–1979)
1976	Southern Connecticut State	5–4			
1977	Southern Connecticut State	4–6			
1978	Southern Connecticut State	3–7			
1978	Southern Connecticut State	3–7			
Southern Connecticut State:		15–24			
Total:		15–24			
