= Matt Elam =

American football player (born 1991)

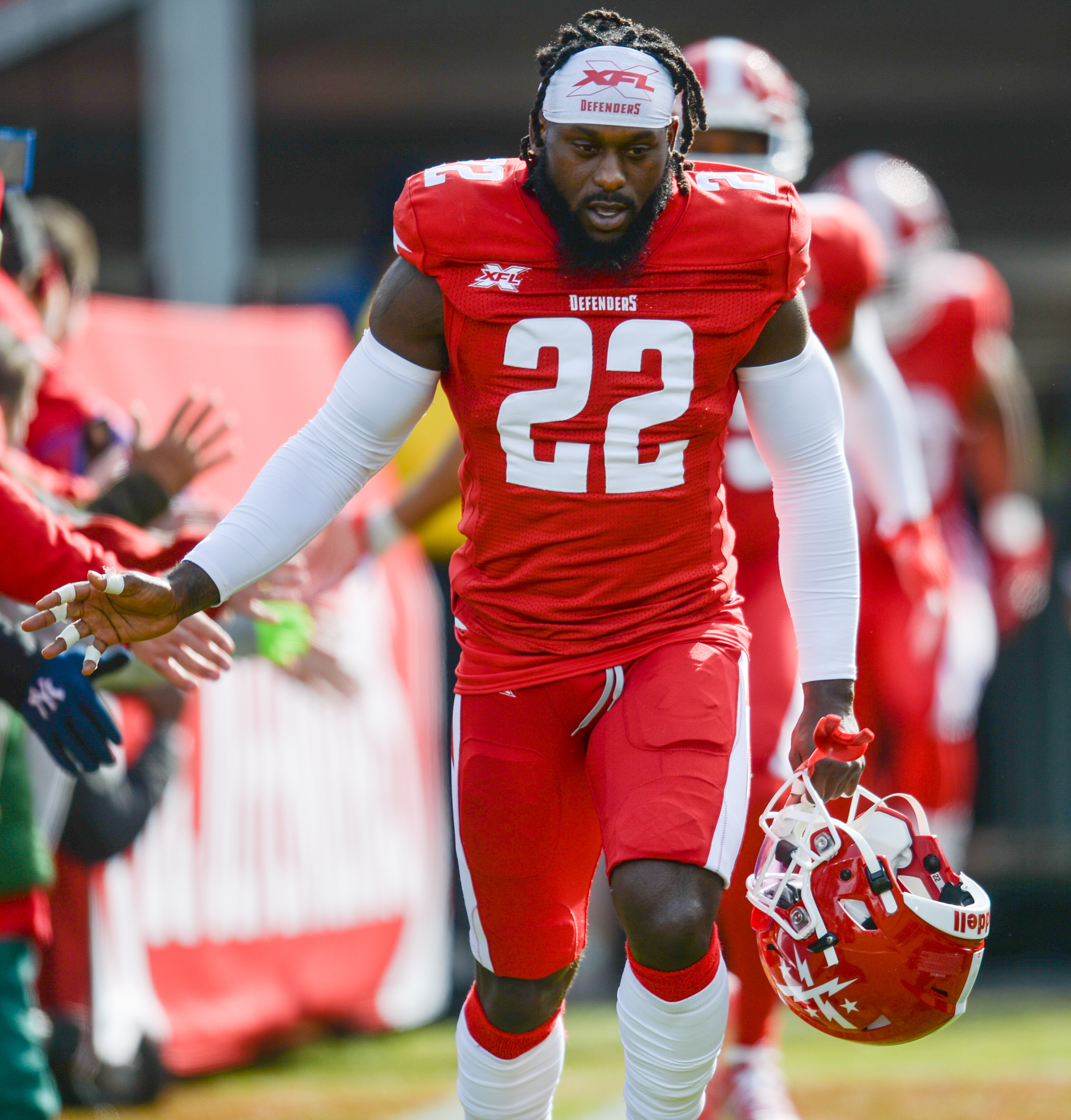
- Elam with the DC Defenders in 2020

Orlando Pirates
- Title: Defensive coordinator

Personal information
- Born: September 21, 1991 (age 35); Palm Beach Gardens, Florida, U.S.
- Listed height: 5 ft 10 in (1.78 m)
- Listed weight: 208 lb (94 kg)

Career information
- High school: William T. Dwyer (Palm Beach Gardens)
- College: Florida (2010–2012)
- NFL draft: 2013: 1st round, 32nd overall pick

Career history

Playing
- Baltimore Ravens (2013–2016); Saskatchewan Roughriders (2018); DC Defenders (2020); Tucson Sugar Skulls (2021); Edmonton Elks (2022); Vegas Knight Hawks (2022–2023); Orlando Guardians (2023); Massachusetts Pirates (2024–2025); San Diego Strike Force (2025); Tulsa Oilers (2026)

Coaching
- Orlando Pirates (2027–present) Defensive coordinator

Awards and highlights
- First-team All-American (2012); First-team All-SEC (2012)

Career NFL statistics
- Total tackles: 131
- Sacks: 0.5
- Forced fumbles: 1
- Fumble recoveries: 2
- Interceptions: 1
- Stats at Pro Football Reference
- Stats at CFL.ca

Matthew D. Elam (born September 21, 1991) is an American former professional football safety who is the defensive coordinator for the Orlando Pirates of the Indoor Football League (IFL). He played college football for the Florida Gators, where he earned All-American honors. He was selected by the Baltimore Ravens in the first round of the 2013 NFL draft.

== Early life ==
Elam was born in Palm Beach Gardens, Florida. He attended William T. Dwyer High School in Palm Beach Gardens, where he played linebacker, defensive back, running back and wide receiver for the Dwyer Panthers high school football team. As a senior, he had 1,883 rushing yards and 27 touchdowns. He was named Gatorade High School Football Player of the Year and Mr. Football for the state of Florida, and a USA Today high school All-American. He played in the 2010 U.S. Army All-American Bowl, where he announced his intent to play at the University of Florida during the game.

== College career ==
Elam accepted an athletic scholarship to attend the University of Florida, where he played for coach Urban Meyer and coach Will Muschamp's Florida Gators football teams from 2010 to 2012. As a freshman in 2010, Elam played in all 13 games and recorded 22 tackles. As a full-time starter during his 2011 sophomore season, he had 78 tackles, two interceptions and two quarterback sacks. Following his junior season in 2012, he was named a first-team All-American by the Associated Press, The Sporting News, CBS Sports, Scout.com and Sports Illustrated, as well as a second-team selection by the Walter Camp Football Foundation. He was also a first-team All-Southeastern Conference selection and a semifinalist for both the Thorpe Award and Bednarik Award.

== Professional career ==
=== Pre-draft ===
Elam was viewed as one of the top safeties in the 2013 draft class. Some experts and scouts said he lacked size for a safety with a height of 5' 10", and should be moved to cornerback instead. He is known for his playmaking ability and for his emotional leadership. Most experts projected Elam to go in the mid-to-late first round of the NFL draft.

Pre-draft measurables
Height	Weight	Arm length	Hand span	40-yard dash	10-yard split	20-yard split	Vertical jump	Broad jump	Bench press
5 ft 9 7/8 in (1.77 m)	208 lb (94 kg)	32 5/8 in (0.83 m)	9 in (0.23 m)	4.54 s	1.58 s	2.53 s	35.5 in (0.90 m)	9 ft 10 in (3.00 m)	17 reps
All values from NFL Combine

=== Baltimore Ravens ===
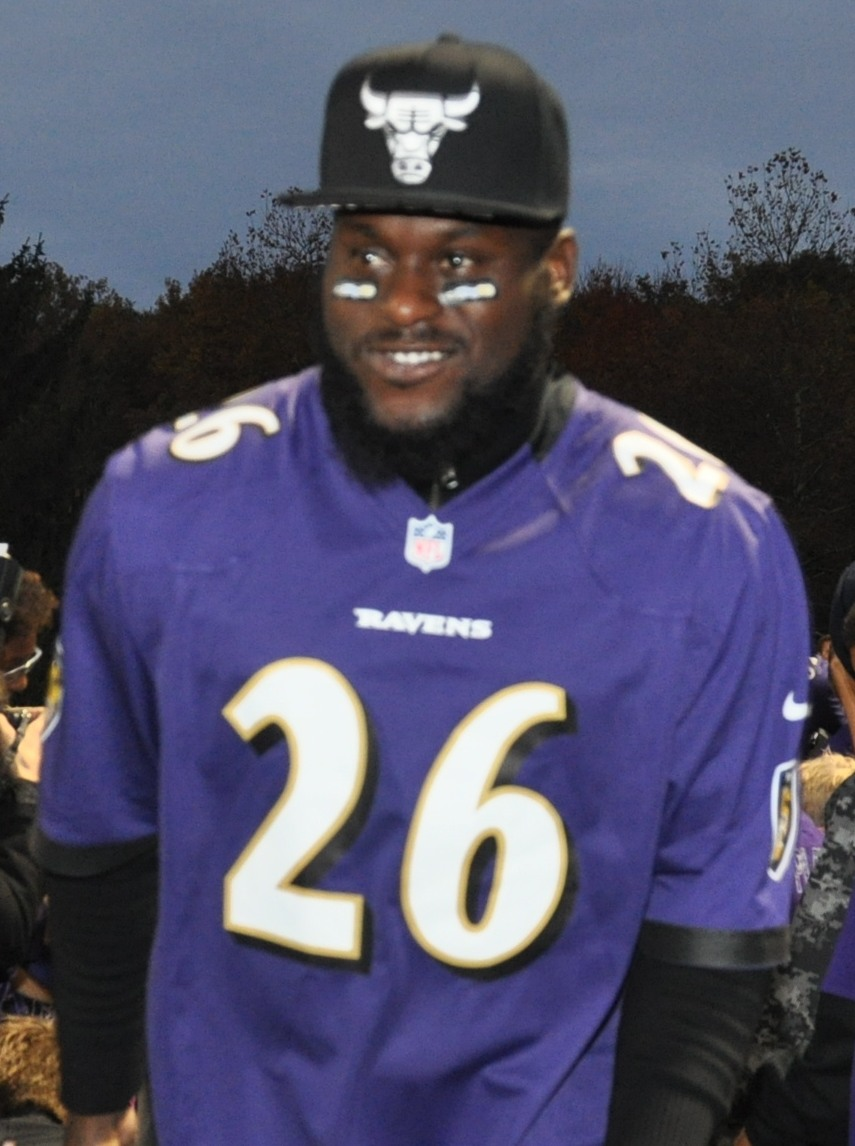
Elam with the Ravens in 2013

The Baltimore Ravens selected him in the first round (32nd overall pick) of the 2013 NFL draft. After a promising rookie season, Elam struggled the following year causing him to lose playing time. On August 31, 2015, Elam was placed on injured reserve, after suffering a torn bicep and missed the entire 2015 NFL season.

On May 2, 2016, the Ravens did not pick up the optional fifth year of his contract. On September 5, 2016, Elam was placed on injured reserve. Elam was activated off injured reserve on November 5, 2016 prior to Week 9.

With declining performance since his rookie year, missing significant playing time, and given the Ravens decision to not pick up the final year of his rookie contract, Elam was considered a bust given his status as a first-round draft pick.

After his arrest on February 26, 2017, the Ravens released a statement regarding the upcoming free agent, stating "we are aware of the arrest of Matt Elam. Matt is not in our plans for the 2017 Ravens", indicating their plans of moving on from Elam.

=== Saskatchewan Roughriders ===
Elam was signed to the practice roster of the Saskatchewan Roughriders of the Canadian Football League (CFL) on July 2, 2018. He was promoted to the active roster on July 24, but was placed on the suspended list on November 7. He was released on May 24, 2019.

=== DC Defenders ===
In October 2019, Elam was picked by the DC Defenders during the open phase of the 2020 XFL draft. He was waived on March 3, 2020.

=== Tucson Sugar Skulls ===
On March 13, 2021, Elam signed with the Tucson Sugar Skulls of the Indoor Football League (IFL).

=== Vegas Knight Hawks (first stint) ===
In November 2021, Elam signed with the Vegas Knight Hawks of the IFL for the 2022 season.

=== Edmonton Elks ===
The Edmonton Elks of the CFL announced the signing of Elam on January 26, 2022. He was released on June 27, 2022.

=== Vegas Knight Hawks (second stint) ===
On July 2, 2022, it was reported that Elam had signed with the Knight Hawks.

=== Orlando Guardians ===
Elam was selected in the 11th round of the 2023 XFL Defensive Backs draft, by the Orlando Guardians.

=== Orlando Predators ===
On December 5, 2023, Elam signed with the Orlando Predators of the Arena Football League.

=== Massachusetts Pirates ===
On February 5, 2024, Elam signed with the Massachusetts Pirates.

== Career statistics ==
Legend
**Bold**	Career high

=== NFL ===
Season	Team	GP	GS	Comb	Total	Ast	Sck	PDef	Int	Yds	Avg	Lng	TDs	FF
2013	Baltimore Ravens	16	15	**77**	**54**	**23**	0.0	3	**1**	**18**	**18.0**	**18**	0	0
2014	Baltimore Ravens	16	11	50	31	19	**0.5**	**4**	0	0	0	0	0	**1**
2016	Baltimore Ravens	9	0	4	4	0	0.0	0	0	0	0	0	0	0
	Total	41	26	131	89	42	0.5	7	1	18	18.0	18	0	1

=== College ===
Career statistics			Tackles			Sacks	Interceptions			Other				
Season	Games	Starts	Solo	Ast	Total	Sack	TFL	Int	Yds	IntTD	DefTD	FFum	FRec	PD
2010	13	0	16	6	22	1.0	1.5	0	0	0	0	0	0	1
2011	13	13	50	**28**	**78**	**2.0**	**11.0**	2	18	0	0	**2**	0	**7**
2012	13	13	**58**	18	76	**2.0**	**11.0**	**4**	**73**	0	0	1	0	5
Totals	**39**	**26**	**124**	**52**	**176**	**5.0**	**23.5**	**6**	**91**	**0**	**0**	**3**	**0**	**13**

== Personal life ==
His older brother, Abram Elam, also played safety for eight seasons (2005)–(2013) in the NFL after going undrafted in 2005. He went on to notably play for the New York Jets, Cleveland Browns, and Dallas Cowboys. His nephew, Kaiir Elam, is the son of Abram and currently plays for the Dallas Cowboys after being selected in the first round (23rd overall) of the 2022 NFL draft by the Buffalo Bills.

=== Legal troubles ===
On February 26, 2017, Elam was arrested in Miami, Florida, for possession of 126.2 grams of marijuana and 3.1 grams of oxycodone. He was charged with one count of cannabis possession, one count of possession of cannabis with intent to sell or deliver, and one count of possession of a controlled substance. On June 26, 2017, the drug charges were dropped.

On May 22, 2017, Elam was arrested on battery and theft charges involving a dispute with his girlfriend over an iPhone. Delray Beach Police charged him with suspicion of grand theft and misdemeanor battery after confrontation and was booked in Palm Beach County Jail and had a bond set at $4,500. According to a police report, he went to his girlfriend's residence to pick up a vehicle and attempted to grab her iPhone from her hand after she refused to give him his money. During the process of grabbing the phone, the couple fell to the ground and continued to struggle over it. She then entered his vehicle and took his cell phone and Elam responded by leaving after she refused to return it. On June 21, 2017, the charges were dropped after the prosecutor said the accuser would not cooperate and they had insufficient evidence to proceed with the case.

== See also ==
- 2012 College Football All-America Team
- List of Baltimore Ravens first-round draft picks
- List of Florida Gators football All-Americans
- List of Florida Gators in the NFL draft
