= Rashod Bateman =

American football player (born 1999)

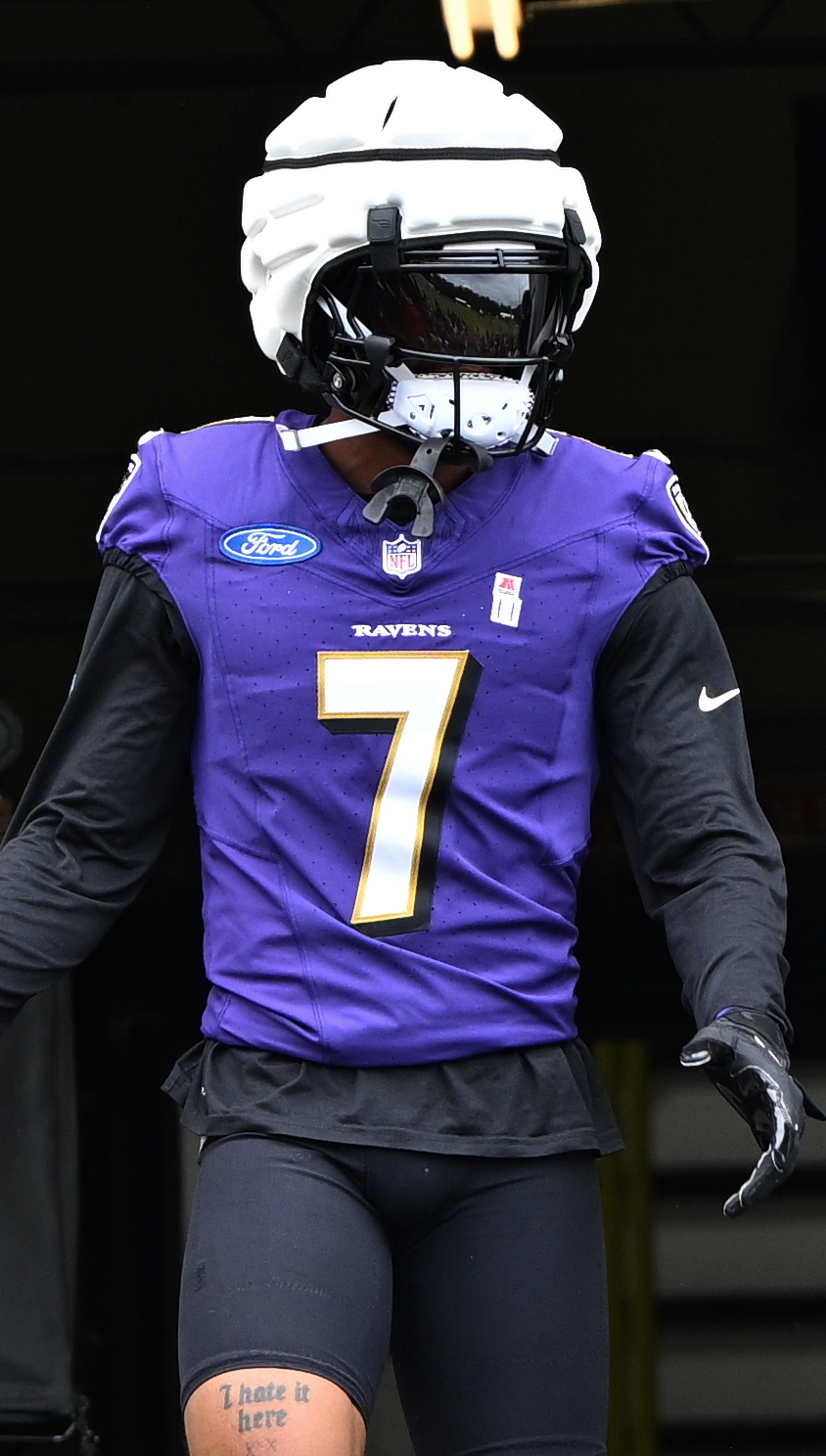
- Bateman with the Baltimore Ravens in 2024

No. 7 – Baltimore Ravens
- Position: Wide receiver
- Roster status: Active

Personal information
- Born: November 29, 1999 (age 26); Tifton, Georgia, U.S.
- Listed height: 6 ft 1 in (1.85 m)
- Listed weight: 193 lb (88 kg)

Career information
- High school: Tift County (Tifton)
- College: Minnesota (2018–2020)
- NFL draft: 2021: 1st round, 27th overall pick

Career history
- Baltimore Ravens (2021–present)

Awards and highlights
- Big Ten Receiver of the Year (2019); First-team All-Big Ten (2019); Third-team All-Big Ten (2020)

Career NFL statistics as of Week 8, 2026
- Receptions: 176
- Receiving yards: 2,435
- Receiving touchdowns: 16
- Stats at Pro Football Reference

Rashod Bateman (born November 29, 1999) is an American professional football wide receiver for the Baltimore Ravens of the National Football League (NFL). He played college football for the Minnesota Golden Gophers and was selected by the Ravens in the first round of the 2021 NFL draft.

== Early life ==
Bateman grew up in Tifton, Georgia and attended Tift County High School. Bateman caught 56 passes for 825 yards and five touchdowns in his junior season and committed to play college football at the University of Minnesota the following summer upon receiving a scholarship offer from the school. As a senior, he was named first team All-State after catching 83 passes for 1,539 yards and 21 touchdowns. Bateman's productive senior season led to him receiving late recruiting interest from many top-level college programs, but he chose to stick to his commitment to Minnesota.

== College career ==
As a true freshman at the University of Minnesota, Bateman started at wide receiver and set freshman records for the Golden Gophers with 51 receptions, 704 receiving yards, and six touchdowns. As a sophomore, Bateman was named a semi-finalist for the Fred Biletnikoff Award and first team All-Big Ten with teammate Tyler Johnson (the first time teammates shared wide receiver honors) and the Richter–Howard Receiver of the Year after catching 57 passes for sophomore records of 1,170 yards (20.5 yards per catch, second all time to Johnson) and 11 touchdowns. Bateman was named a second team All-American by Sports Illustrated and USA Today and was a third team selection by the Associated Press.

On August 4, 2020, Bateman announced that he would forgo his 2020 season due to the Big Ten's decision to not play football during the COVID-19 pandemic. However, the Big Ten would later reverse their decision, with Bateman also rejoining the team for the shortened season.

=== College statistics ===
Year	Team	Games		Receiving			
Year	Team	GP	GS	Rec	Yards	Avg	TD
2018	Minnesota	13	13	51	704	13.8	6
2019	Minnesota	13	13	60	1,219	20.3	11
2020	Minnesota	5	5	36	472	13.1	2
Career		31	31	147	2,395	16.3	19

== Professional career ==
Pre-draft measurables
Height	Weight	Arm length	Hand span	Wingspan	40-yard dash	10-yard split	20-yard split	20-yard shuttle	Three-cone drill	Vertical jump	Broad jump
6 ft 0 3/8 in (1.84 m)	190 lb (86 kg)	33 in (0.84 m)	9 1/2 in (0.24 m)	6 ft 4 1/2 in (1.94 m)	4.41 s	1.55 s	2.56 s	4.35 s	6.95 s	36.0 in (0.91 m)	10 ft 3 in (3.12 m)
All values from Pro Day

=== 2021 season ===
Bateman was selected by the Baltimore Ravens with the 27th overall pick of the 2021 NFL draft, making him the first Gopher to be drafted in the first round since Laurence Maroney in 2006. On May 12, 2021, Bateman signed with the Ravens on a $12.6 million contract that included a $6.5 million signing bonus.

On September 1, 2021, Bateman was placed on injured reserve to start the season after undergoing groin surgery. On October 16, 2021, Bateman was activated to the active roster from injured reserve. In Week 14, Bateman recorded his first 100-yard game catching seven passes for 103 yards in a 22–24 loss against the Cleveland Browns. In Week 16 against the Cincinnati Bengals, Bateman scored his first NFL touchdown on a 4-yard pass from Josh Johnson in the 41–21 loss. He finished with 46 receptions for 515 receiving yards and one touchdown in 12 games.

=== 2022 season ===
Bateman became a full-time starting wide receiver along with Devin Duvernay following the trade of Marquise Brown to the Arizona Cardinals during the offseason. In a Week 2 38–42 shootout loss to the Miami Dolphins, Bateman recorded 108 receiving yards on four catches, including one catch that he took 75 yards for a touchdown. The following week, in a 37–26 win over the New England Patriots, he had two catches for 59 yards, although he fumbled away the ball on the first catch. However, he also injured his foot during the game and missed the following two games. Bateman returned against the Tampa Bay Buccaneers, but left in the second quarter with a foot injury. On November 3, 2022, it was announced Bateman would undergo surgery on his foot, ending his season. He finished with 15 receptions for 285 receiving yards and two receiving touchdowns in six games.

=== 2023 season ===
Bateman recorded at least one reception in all but two games during the 2023 regular season. He caught his only touchdown of the season on a 10-yard reception in a Week 11 34–20 win over the Cincinnati Bengals. Bateman's best game came in Week 17 when he caught four passes for 54 yards in a 56–19 blowout win over the Miami Dolphins. Bateman finished the season with 32 receptions for 367 yards and a touchdown along with one rush for 18 yards.

In the Divisional Round against the Houston Texans, Bateman recorded three receptions for 39 yards in a 34–10 rout.

=== 2024 season ===
Bateman signed a new three-year $15 million contract extension through the 2026 season on April 24, 2024. In Week 7 against the Buccaneers, Bateman had 4 receptions for 121 yards and a touchdown as the Ravens won 41-31. It was his third 100-yard game and his first since Week 2 of the 2022 season. In Week 15 against the New York Giants, Bateman had 5 receptions for 80 yards and two touchdowns, including a 49-yard touchdown. It was the first game where Bateman had 2 touchdowns in the same game as the Ravens won 35-14. In Week 18 against the Cleveland Browns, Bateman recorded 8 receptions for 80 yards and a touchdown as the Ravens would win 35-10, clinching the AFC North for the second year in a row.

In what became a breakout season for Bateman, he finished the regular season with career-highs in yards and touchdowns as he recorded 45 catches for 756 yards and 9 touchdowns.

=== 2025 season ===
On June 5, 2025, Bateman signed a three-year, $36.75 million extension with $20 million guaranteed, keeping him through the 2029 season.

Bateman appeared in 13 games during the regular season, recording 19 receptions for 224 yards and 2 touchdowns.

== NFL career statistics ==
=== Regular season ===
Year	Team	Games		Receiving					Fumbles	
Year	Team	GP	GS	Rec	Yds	Avg	Lng	TD	Fum	Lost
2021	BAL	12	4	46	515	11.2	36	1	0	0
2022	BAL	6	5	15	285	19.0	75	2	1	1
2023	BAL	16	12	32	367	11.5	29	1	0	0
2024	BAL	17	14	45	756	16.8	59	9	0	0
2025	BAL	13	12	19	224	11.8	36	2	0	0
Total		64	47	157	2,147	13.7	75	15	1	1

=== Postseason ===
Year	Team	Games		Receiving					Fumbles	
Year	Team	GP	GS	Rec	Yds	Avg	Lng	TD	Fum	Lost
2022	BAL	0	0	Did not play due to injury						
2023	BAL	2	2	4	41	10.3	21	0	0	0
2024	BAL	2	2	6	90	15.0	42	2	0	0
Total		4	4	10	131	13.10	21	2	0	0

== Legal issues ==
On August 21, 2026, it was revealed that Bateman was arrested in Walton County, Georgia dating back to June 3 that year due to misdemeanor battery, reckless conduct, and first degree criminal damage to property. At the time of this incident, Bateman allegedly smashed a window of a vehicle being driven by the mother of his 3-month-old child. Fragments of the smashed windows led to small lacerations around the victim's face. Bateman eventually turned himself in to authorities, where he was given a no-contact order to his victim, though the court lifted the order by Bateman's request.
