= Nate Wiggins =

American football player (born 2003)

No. 2 – Baltimore Ravens
- Position: Cornerback
- Roster status: Active

Personal information
- Born: August 28, 2003 (age 23); Atlanta, Georgia, U.S.
- Listed height: 6 ft 1 in (1.85 m)
- Listed weight: 182 lb (83 kg)

Career information
- High school: Westlake (Atlanta)
- College: Clemson (2021–2023)
- NFL draft: 2024: 1st round, 30th overall pick

Career history
- Baltimore Ravens (2024–present)

Awards and highlights
- First-team All-ACC (2023)

Career NFL statistics as of Week 7, 2026
- Tackles: 131
- Forced fumbles: 1
- Pass deflections: 31
- Interceptions: 4
- Touchdowns: 1
- Stats at Pro Football Reference

Nathaniel Wiggins (born August 28, 2003) is an American professional football cornerback for the Baltimore Ravens of the National Football League (NFL). He played college football for the Clemson Tigers and was drafted by the Ravens in the first round of the 2024 NFL draft.

== Early life ==
Wiggins originally attended Grady High School in Atlanta before transferring to Westlake High School for his senior season. In high school he played both wide receiver and cornerback but was primarily recruited as cornerback. At the conclusion of his high school career he would be selected to and played in the 2021 All-American Bowl. Wiggins was a 4 star recruit ranked the nations #7 overall corner prospect. He originally committed to play college football at LSU before flipping to Clemson University four days prior to national signing day.

== College career ==
In his freshman year, Wiggins saw limited playing time and struggled off the field, with both himself and head coach Dabo Swinney later describing him as immature. Wiggins entered his sophomore season with high expectations after he received praise from coaches and teammates for his growth and maturation during the offseason. In the Tigers victory in the 2022 ACC Championship Game, Wiggins had a 98 yard Pick-Six, the longest in ACC Championship history. Wiggins finished the season with 30 tackles, 11 passes defended and one interception. In 2023, he received first-team All-ACC honors and declared for the 2024 NFL draft after the season.

== Professional career ==
Pre-draft measurables
Height	Weight	Arm length	Hand span	Wingspan	40-yard dash	10-yard split	20-yard split	Vertical jump	Broad jump
6 ft 1 3/8 in (1.86 m)	173 lb (78 kg)	30 1/2 in (0.77 m)	9 in (0.23 m)	6 ft 2 1/4 in (1.89 m)	4.28 s	1.59 s	2.52 s	36.0 in (0.91 m)	10 ft 7 in (3.23 m)
All values from NFL Combine

Wiggins was selected by the Baltimore Ravens in the first round of the 2024 NFL draft with the 30th overall pick.

In week 3 against the Dallas Cowboys, Wiggins recorded a forced fumble off of CeeDee Lamb with the ball being recovered by his teammate Marcus Williams. The Ravens won the game 28–25. In week 18 against the Cleveland Browns, Wiggins recorded his first career interception against Bailey Zappe, and returned the pass 26 yards for his first career touchdown.

== Career statistics ==
=== NFL ===
Year	Team	Games		Tackles				Interceptions					Fumbles			
Year	Team	GP	GS	Cmb	Solo	Ast	Sck	PD	Int	Yds	Avg	TD	FF	FR	Yds	TD
2024	BAL	15	6	33	25	8	0.0	13	1	26	26.0	1	1	0	0	0
2025	BAL	17	17	76	57	19	0.0	14	3	84	28.0	0	0	0	0	0
2026	BAL	8	8	24	18	7	0.0	4	0	0	0.0	0	0	0	0	0
Career		34	25	136	99	34	0.0	32	4	110	27.0	1	1	0	0	0

=== College ===
Year	Team	GP	Tackles					Interceptions					Fumbles	
Year	Team	GP	Solo	Ast	Tot	Loss	Sk	Int	Yds	Avg	TD	PD	FF	FR
2021	Clemson	4	1	1	2	0.0	0.0	0	0	0.0	0	2	0	0
2022	Clemson	13	25	4	29	2.0	0.0	1	98	98.0	1	13	0	0
2023	Clemson	10	23	6	29	1.0	1.0	2	52	26.0	1	6	2	0
Career		27	49	11	60	3.0	1.0	3	150	50.0	2	21	2	0
