= Tyler Linderbaum =

American football player (born 2000)

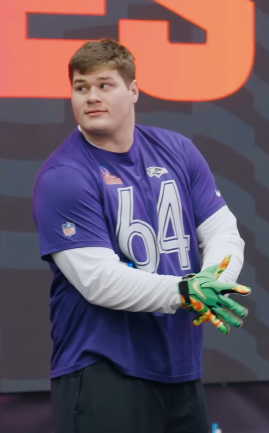
- Linderbaum at the 2026 Pro Bowl Games

No. 65 – Las Vegas Raiders
- Position: Center
- Roster status: Active

Personal information
- Born: April 7, 2000 (age 26); Solon, Iowa, U.S.
- Listed height: 6 ft 2 in (1.88 m)
- Listed weight: 305 lb (138 kg)

Career information
- High school: Solon
- College: Iowa (2018–2021)
- NFL draft: 2022: 1st round, 25th overall pick

Career history
- Baltimore Ravens (2022–2025); Las Vegas Raiders (2026–present)

Awards and highlights
- 3× Pro Bowl (2023–2025); PFWA All-Rookie Team (2022); Rimington Trophy (2021); Unanimous All-American (2021); Big Ten Offensive Lineman of the Year (2021); 2× First-team All-Big Ten (2020, 2021)

Career NFL statistics as of Week 10, 2026
- Games played: 76
- Games started: 76
- Stats at Pro Football Reference

Tyler Linderbaum (born April 7, 2000) is an American professional football center for the Las Vegas Raiders of the National Football League (NFL). He played college football for the Iowa Hawkeyes, and was selected by the Baltimore Ravens in the first round of the 2022 NFL draft.

== Early life ==
Linderbaum was born on April 7, 2000 in Solon, Iowa and is of German descent. He later attended Solon High School, where he played both offensive and defensive line. Linderbaum played in the 2018 U.S. Army All-American Game. He committed to the University of Iowa to play college football.

== College career ==
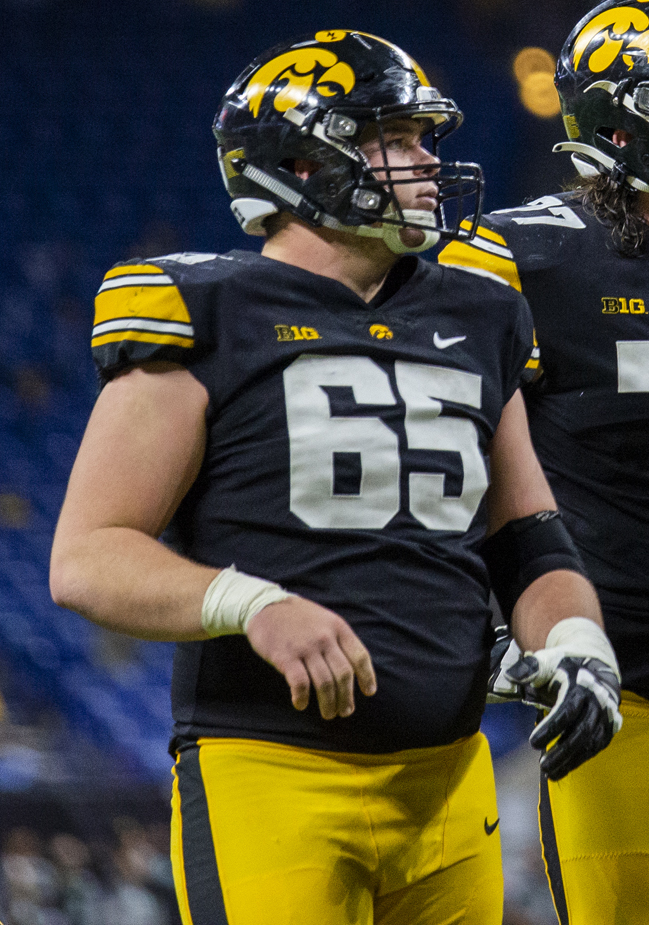
Linderbaum with the Iowa Hawkeyes in 2021

Linderbaum began his career at Iowa as a defensive lineman before moving to center prior to the 2019 season. He started all 13 games that season. He returned as the starter in 2020 and was named an All-American as well as a finalist for the Rimington Trophy. In 2021, was named the Rimington–Pace Offensive Lineman of the Year and won the Rimington Trophy while being named to a unanimous All-American.

== Professional career ==
Pre-draft measurables
Height	Weight	Arm length	Hand span	Wingspan	40-yard dash	10-yard split	20-yard split	20-yard shuttle	Three-cone drill	Vertical jump	Broad jump	Bench press
6 ft 2 1/8 in (1.88 m)	296 lb (134 kg)	31 1/8 in (0.79 m)	10 in (0.25 m)	6 ft 3 5/8 in (1.92 m)	5.04 s	1.78 s	2.90 s	4.57 s	7.13 s	32.5 in (0.83 m)	9 ft 2 in (2.79 m)	24 reps
All values from NFL Combine/Pro Day

=== Baltimore Ravens ===
Linderbaum was selected by the Baltimore Ravens in the first round with the 25th overall pick after a trade with the Arizona Cardinals to get the draft pick in the 2022 NFL draft. Linderbaum started all 17 regular season games and one playoff game for the Ravens in his rookie season. He earned a spot on the PFWA All-Rookie Team. He started 14 games in his second season and was named to his first career Pro Bowl towards the end of the season.

He was named to his second consecutive Pro Bowl on January 2, 2025.

On April 30, 2025, the Ravens opted not to exercise the fifth-year option on Linderbaum's contract, citing financial reasons.

Linderbaum was selected to his third consecutive Pro Bowl in December 2025.

=== Las Vegas Raiders ===
On March 12, 2026, the Las Vegas Raiders signed Linderbaum to a three-year, $81 million contract that includes $60 million guaranteed and a signing bonus of $20 million.

=== Regular season statistics ===
Legend
**Bold**	Career high

Year	Team	Games		Offense					
Year	Team	GP	GS	Snaps	Pct	Holding	False start	Decl/Pen	Acpt/Pen
2022	BAL	17	17	**1,094**	**100%**	**3**	**3**	0	6
2023	BAL	15	15	918	94%	2	1	0	3
2024	BAL	17	17	**1,094**	99%	**3**	2	1	**7**
2025	BAL	17	17	1,008	99%	2	0	**2**	3
2026	LVR	10	10	651	100%	1	2	0	5
Career		76	76	4,765	–	11	8	3	24
