= Mark DeLeone =

American football coach (1987)

Nordic Storm
- Title: Defensive coordinator

Personal information
- Born: June 30, 1987 (age 39); Syracuse, New York, U.S.

Career history
- Iowa (2007–2008) Defensive student assistant; New Hampshire (2009) Director of football operations / assistant offensive line coach; Florida (2010) Quality control coach; Temple (2011) Graduate assistant; New York Jets (2012) Defensive assistant; Kansas City Chiefs (2013–2015) Defensive quality control coach; Kansas City Chiefs (2016–2017) Assistant linebackers coach; Kansas City Chiefs (2018) Inside linebackers coach; Chicago Bears (2019–2020) Inside linebackers coach; Detroit Lions (2021) Inside linebackers coach; Kansas (2022–2023) Defensive analyst; Baltimore Ravens (2024) Inside linebackers coach; Kansas City Chiefs (2025) Assistant running backs coach; Nordic Storm (2026-present) Defensive Coordinator

Mark DeLeone (born June 30, 1987) is an American football coach who is the assistant running backs coach for the Kansas City Chiefs of the National Football League (NFL). He was previously the inside linebackers coach of the Chiefs in 2018, the Chicago Bears in 2019 and 2020, the Detroit Lions in 2021, and the Baltimore Ravens in 2024.

== Coaching career ==
=== Kansas City Chiefs ===
On April 1, 2016, DeLeone was promoted to the Kansas City Chiefs assistant linebackers coach. The Chiefs went 12–4 in 2016 and clinched the AFC West title for the first time since 2010 and made the playoffs for the second year in a row for the first time since 1995. They would lose in the Divisional Round against the Pittsburgh Steelers 16–18. During the season they would defeat the NFC Champions, the Atlanta Falcons 29–28. Linebackers Justin Houston, Derrick Johnson, and Tamba Hali would make the NFL's Top 100, ranked 26th, 80th, and 84th respectively.

The Chiefs went 10–6 in 2017 and won back-to-back AFC West titles for the first time in franchise history and made the playoffs for the third year in a row for the first time since 1994. They would lose to the Tennessee Titans in the Wild Card round 21–22. They would defeat both the AFC champion New England Patriots and the NFC champion Philadelphia Eagles during the season. Under his coaching, Justin Houston would rank 7th in tackles for loss. Justin Houston would make the NFL's Top 100 ranked 76th.

In the 2017 offseason, Derrick Johnson left in free agency & Tamba Hali was released. On January 29, 2018, DeLeone was promoted to the Kansas City Chiefs inside linebackers coach. The Chiefs went 12-4 and won their third straight AFC West title in franchise history and made the playoffs for the fourth year in a row for the first time since 1993. They would go on to defeat the Indianapolis Colts in the Divisional Round 31-13 and then lose to the New England Patriots in the AFC Championship game 31–37. During the season they defeated two playoff teams; the AFC North champion Baltimore Ravens and the Los Angeles Chargers. Under his coaching, Justin Houston ranked 5th in forced fumbles and linebacker Reggie Ragland recorded the 8th longest interception return. At the end of the season, defensive coordinator Bob Sutton was fired and DeLeone left to join his former offensive coordinator Matt Nagy.

=== Chicago Bears ===
On January 29, 2019, the Chicago Bears named DeLeone the inside linebackers coach. The Bears went 8–8 in 2019 and missed the playoffs.

=== Detroit Lions ===
On January 28, 2021, the Detroit Lions hired DeLeone as their inside linebacker coach. On February 16, 2022, the Lions parted ways with DeLeone after one season.

=== Kansas Jayhawks ===
In the spring of 2022, DeLeone was hired as a defensive analyst at Kansas.

=== Baltimore Ravens ===
On January 28, 2025, it was announced that DeLeone would not return to the Baltimore Ravens, having spent one season with the team serving as their inside linebackers coach.

== Personal life ==
Mark graduated from the University of Iowa, earning a bachelor's degree in liberal arts & sciences. He is the son of the late George DeLeone, who was an assistant coach in college football and the NFL for nearly 50 years.
