= Joe D'Alessandris =

American football coach (1954–2024)

Personal information
- Born: April 29, 1954; Sewickley, Pennsylvania, U.S.
- Died: August 25, 2024 (aged 70); Baltimore, Maryland, U.S.

Career information
- College: Western Carolina

Career history
- Western Carolina (1977–1978) Graduate assistant; Livingston (1979–1982) Offensive line coach; Livingston (1983) Offensive coordinator/offensive line coach; Memphis (1984–1985) Offensive line coach; Chattanooga (1986–1987) Offensive coordinator/offensive line coach; Chattanooga (1988–1989) Offensive line coach; Ottawa Rough Riders (1990) Offensive line coach; Birmingham Fire (1991–1992) Offensive line coach; Samford (1993) Offensive line coach/assistant head coach; Texas A&M (1994) Offensive line coach; Memphis Mad Dogs (1995) Offensive line coach; Pittsburgh (1996) Offensive line coach; Duke (1997–2001) Offensive line coach; Georgia Tech (2002–2007) Offensive line coach; Kansas City Chiefs (2008–2009) Assistant offensive line coach; Buffalo Bills (2010–2012) Offensive line coach; San Diego Chargers (2013–2015) Offensive line coach; Baltimore Ravens (2017–2024) Offensive line coach

Joe D'Alessandris (April 29, 1954 – August 25, 2024) was an American football coach. He was an offensive line coach in the National Football League (NFL) for the Buffalo Bills, San Diego Chargers, and Baltimore Ravens.

== Early life ==
D'Alessandris was born on April 29, 1954, in Sewickley, Pennsylvania. He was a native of Aliquippa, Pennsylvania, and attended Center High School. He was a guard at Western Carolina University, where he was the team's MVP and a captain as a senior.

== Coaching career ==
D'Alessandris began his coaching career at Western Carolina as a graduate assistant in 1977. He coached offensive lines in college football, the Canadian Football League (CFL), the World League of American Football and the National Football League (NFL). He was a college football coach at Livingston University from 1979 to 1983, at the University of Memphis from 1984 to 1985, at the University of Tennessee at Chattanooga from 1986 to 1989, at Samford University in 1993, at Texas A&M in 1994, at the University of Pittsburgh in 1996, at Duke University from 1997 to 2001 and at Georgia Tech from 2002 to 2007.

In the CFL, D'Alessandris was the offensive line coach for the Ottawa Rough Riders in 1990 and for the Memphis Mad Dogs in 1995. From 1991 to 1992, he was the offensive line coach of the Birmingham Fire of the World League of American Football for two seasons.

In the NFL, he was the Chiefs assistant offensive line coach from 2008 to 2009. D'Alessandris served as the offensive line coach for the Buffalo Bills from 2010 to 2012 and as the offensive line coach for the San Diego Chargers from 2013 to 2015. D'Alessandris was hired by the Baltimore Ravens as their offensive line coach on January 19, 2017. He missed the Ravens' week 12 game in 2020 against the Pittsburgh Steelers due to being sick with COVID-19.

== Personal life and death ==
D'Alessandris married Toni Mayfield shortly after college. They have three daughters, Kelly, Emily and Anna; and five grandchildren. Toni died on May 4, 2022.

He was the reader during the Ravens' Mass on game days.

D'Alessandris died on the morning of August 25, 2024, due to an illness that was a complication of a surgery that was performed earlier in the summer.
