= 2025 Baltimore Ravens season =

30th season in franchise history, final one under head coach John Harbaugh

- Owner: Steve Bisciotti
- General manager: Eric DeCosta
- Head coach: John Harbaugh
- Offensive coordinator: Todd Monken
- Defensive coordinator: Zach Orr
- Home stadium: M&T Bank Stadium

Results
- Record: 8–9
- Division place: 2nd AFC North
- Playoffs: Did not qualify
- All-Pros: SS Kyle Hamilton (1st team); FB Patrick Ricard (2nd team); P Jordan Stout (1st team)
- Pro Bowlers: 6: WR Zay Flowers; SS Kyle Hamilton; C Tyler Linderbaum; FB Patrick Ricard; ILB Roquan Smith; P Jordan Stout

Uniform
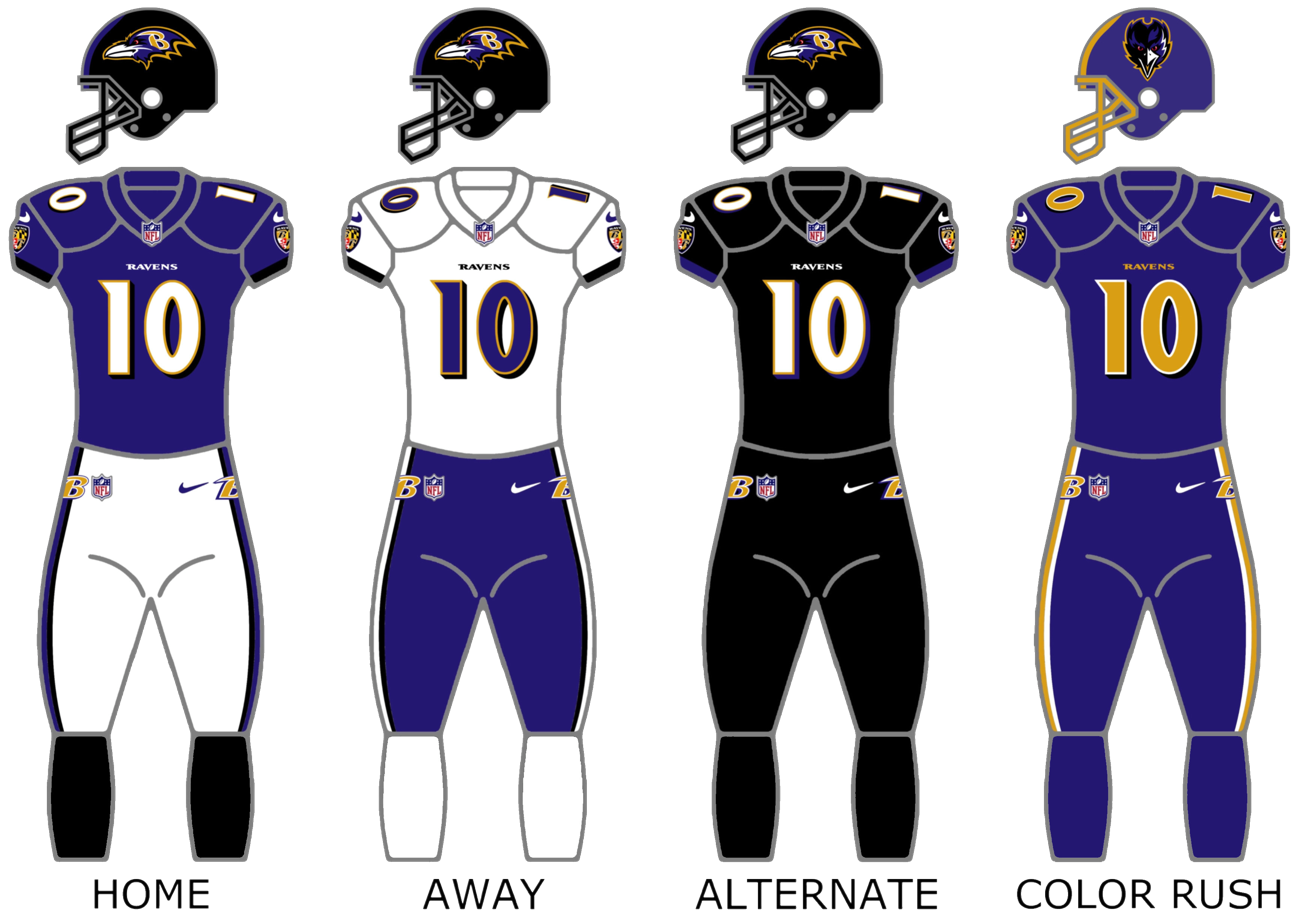

The 2025 season was the Baltimore Ravens' 30th in the National Football League (NFL) and their 18th and final under head coach John Harbaugh.

Despite entering the season as one of the preseason favorites to win the Super Bowl, the Ravens stumbled to an abysmal 1–5 start. They rebounded with a midseason turnaround, winning five consecutive games to improve to 6–5 and briefly take first place in the AFC North. However, they faltered down the stretch, winning just two of their final six games, and they were eliminated from playoff contention for the first time since 2021 after a Week 18 loss to their archrival Pittsburgh Steelers.

This was the first season since 2011 without kicker Justin Tucker, who was the last Raven on the roster to have played for the team's 2012 Super Bowl championship team, as Tucker was released by the team amid allegations of inappropriate sexual conduct on May 5.

This season would be the end of John Harbaugh's coaching tenure in Baltimore, as he was dismissed two days after the season ended. Harbaugh compiled a 180–113 regular season record and a 13–11 record in the playoffs, winning Super Bowl XLVII against his brother Jim Harbaugh in the 2012 season and was named Coach of the Year in 2019.

== Offseason ==
=== Free agents ===
Position	Player	Tag	2025 team	Date signed	Contract
WR	Nelson Agholor	UFA			
ILB	Chris Board	UFA	New York Giants	March 10, 2025	2 years, $5.7 million
OG	Ben Cleveland	UFA	Baltimore Ravens	March 11, 2025	1 year, $1.17 million
ILB	Malik Harrison	UFA	Pittsburgh Steelers	March 10, 2025	2 years, $10 million
WR	Deonte Harty	UFA			
WR	Diontae Johnson	UFA	Cleveland Browns	April 28, 2025	1 year, $1.17 million
QB	Josh Johnson	UFA	Washington Commanders	April 11, 2025	1 year, $1.42 million
OT	Josh Jones	UFA	Seattle Seahawks	March 10, 2025	1 year, $4 million
CB	Christian Matthew	RFA			
OG	Patrick Mekari	UFA	Jacksonville Jaguars	March 10, 2025	3 years, $37.5 million
CB	Trayvon Mullen	UFA			
FB	Patrick Ricard	UFA	Baltimore Ravens	March 11, 2025	1 year, $2.87 million
WR	Steven Sims	UFA	Seattle Seahawks	March 25, 2025	1 year, $1.17 million
OT	Ronnie Stanley	UFA	Baltimore Ravens	March 8, 2025	3 years, $60 million
CB	Brandon Stephens	UFA	New York Jets	March 10, 2025	3 years, $36 million
DE	Brent Urban	UFA	Baltimore Ravens	August 2, 2025	TBD
WR	Tylan Wallace	UFA	Baltimore Ravens	March 12, 2025	1 year, $2.1 million
ILB	Kristian Welch	UFA	Green Bay Packers	March 28, 2025	1 year, $1.17 million
CB	Tre'Davious White	UFA	Buffalo Bills	April 17, 2025	1 year, $3 million
S	Ar'Darius Washington	RFA	Baltimore Ravens	April 21, 2025	1 year, $3.26 million
RB	Owen Wright	ERFA	Tampa Bay Buccaneers	July 31, 2025	TBD

=== Signings ===
Position	Player	Previous team	Date signed	Contract
WR	DeAndre Hopkins	Kansas City Chiefs	March 11, 2025	1 year, $5 million
LB	Jake Hummel	Los Angeles Rams	March 12, 2025	1 year, $1.2 million
QB	Cooper Rush	Dallas Cowboys	March 16, 2025	2 years, $6.2 million
CB	Chidobe Awuzie	Tennessee Titans	March 25, 2025	1 year, $1.25 million
OT	Joseph Noteboom	Los Angeles Rams	May 3, 2025	1 year, $2 million
CB	Jaire Alexander	Green Bay Packers	June 18, 2025	1 year, $4 million
RB	D'Ernest Johnson	Jacksonville Jaguars	August 2, 2025	TBD

=== Extensions ===
Below are players who are under contract through 2025 and received a contract extension.

Position	Player	Date signed	Notes
RB	Derrick Henry	May 14, 2025	2 years, $30 million
WR	Rashod Bateman	June 5, 2025	3 years, $36.75 million
S	Kyle Hamilton	August 27, 2025	4 years, $100.4 million (Note: Hamilton signed his fifth-year option for 1 year, $18.6 million for the 2026 season.)

=== Releases ===
Position	Player	2025 team	Date
CB	Arthur Maulet	Houston Texans	March 11, 2025
S	Marcus Williams	TBD	March 12, 2025
K	Justin Tucker	TBD	May 5, 2025

=== Retirements ===
Position	Player	Date Retired	Years with the Ravens	Years in the NFL
DT	Michael Pierce	March 12, 2025	7	9

== Draft ==
2025 Baltimore Ravens draft selections
Round	Selection	Player	Position	College	Notes
1	27	Malaki Starks	S	Georgia	
2	59	Mike Green	OLB	Marshall	
3	91	Emery Jones Jr.	OT	LSU	
4	129	Teddye Buchanan	LB	California	
4	136	Traded to the Tennessee Titans (Note: The Ravens traded a fourth-round (136th overall) and sixth-round selection (183rd overall) to the Tennessee Titans in exchange for a fifth-round (141st overall) and sixth-round selection (178th overall).)			Compensatory selection
5	141	Carson Vinson	OT	Alabama A&M	From Tennessee Titans
5	163	Traded to the Carolina Panthers (Note: The Ravens traded a fifth-round selection (163rd overall) to the Carolina Panthers in exchange for a sixth-round selection (183rd overall) and WR Diontae Johnson.)			
5	176	Traded to the New York Jets (Note: The Ravens traded a fifth-round (176th overall) and a 2026 sixth-round selection to the New York Jets in exchange for a sixth-round (186st overall) and 2026 fifth-round selection.)			
6	178	Bilhal Kone	CB	Western Michigan	From Tennessee Titans
6	183	Traded to the Tennessee Titans			From Panthers
6	186	Tyler Loop	K	Arizona	From New York Jets
6	203	LaJohntay Wester	WR	Colorado	
6	210	Aeneas Peebles	DT	Virginia Tech	Compensatory selection
6	212	Robert Longerbeam	CB	Rutgers	Compensatory selection
7	243	Garrett Dellinger	OG	LSU	

Draft trades

2025 Baltimore Ravens undrafted free agents
Name	Position	College	Ref.
Jahmal Banks	WR	Nebraska	
Diwun Black	OLB	Temple	
Gerad Christian-Lichtenhan	OT	Oregon State	
Xavier Guillory	WR	Arizona State	
Jay Higgins	ILB	Iowa	
Reid Holskey	OT	Miami (OH)	
John Hoyland	K	Wyoming	
Ozzie Hutchinson	OT	Albany	
Desmond Igbinosun	S	Rutgers	
Keondre Jackson	S	Illinois State	
Jayson Jones	DT	Auburn	
Reuben Lowery	CB	Chattanooga	
Marcus Major	RB	Minnesota	
Chandler Martin	ILB	Memphis	
Keyon Martin	CB	Louisiana	
Sone Ntoh	RB	Monmouth	
Jared Penning	OG	Northern Iowa	
Sam Pitz	TE	Minnesota-Duluth	
Marquise Robinson	CB	Arkansas	
Kaimon Rucker	OLB	North Carolina	
Lucas Scott	FB/TE	Army	

== Staff ==
=== Coaching changes ===
2025 Baltimore Ravens Staff Changes
Coach	Position	Reason left	Replacement	Ref.
Doug Mallory	Secondary coach	Parted ways	Chuck Pagano	
Chris Hewitt	Assistant head coach & pass game coordinator	Parted ways	Willie Taggart (Note: Taggart was promoted to assistant head coach but will also remain the teams running back coach.)	
Mark DeLeone	Inside linebackers coach	Parted ways	Tyler Santucci	
N/A	Outside linebackers coach	N/A (position created)	Matt Robinson	
N/A	Assistant linebackers coach	N/A (position created)	Matt Pees	
N/A	Defensive backs coach	N/A (position created)	Donald D'Alesio	
N/A	Assistant special teams coach	N/A (position created)	Anthony Levine Sr.	

Coaching notes

2025 Baltimore Ravens staff
Front office: Owner – Steve Bisciotti; President – Sashi Brown; Executive vice president/general manager – Eric DeCosta; Executive vice president – Ozzie Newsome; Vice president of player personnel – George Kokinis; Director of player personnel – Mark Azevedo; Director of college scouting – Andrew Raphael; Assistant director of college scouting – Joey Cleary; Assistant director of pro personnel – Corey Frazier; Vice president of football administration – Nick Matteo; Senior personnel executive - Bobby Vega; Vice president of research and development - David McDonald; Director of learning and development - Steve Clagett; Director of data and decision science - Derrick Yam; Director of football systems - James Oncea; Consultant – Pat Moriarty; Assistant director of Coaching research – Ben Davis; Senior director of football information – Megan McLaughlin; Head coaches: Head coach – John Harbaugh; Assistant head coach/running backs – Willie Taggart; Offensive coaches: Offensive coordinator – Todd Monken; Quarterbacks – Tee Martin; Director of football strategy/assistant quarterbacks – Daniel Stern; Wide receivers – Greg Lewis; Tight ends – George Godsey; Offensive line – George Warhop; Assistant offensive line – Travelle Wharton; Run game coordinator – Travis Switzer; Offensive assistant – Danny Breyer; Offensive quality control – Adam Schrack	Defensive coaches: Defensive coordinator – Zachary Orr; Defensive line – Dennis Johnson; Inside linebackers – Tyler Santucci; Outside linebackers – Matt Robinson; Assistant linebackers – Matt Pees; Defensive backs – Donald D'Alesio; Senior defensive assistant/secondary – Chuck Pagano; Pass rush coach – Chuck Smith; Defensive quality control – Brendan Clark; Assistant to the head coach/defensive assistant – Megan Rosburg; Special teams coaches: Special Teams coordinator – Chris Horton; Senior special teams – Randy Brown; Assistant special teams – Anthony Levine Sr.; Baltimore Ravens coaching fellowship – DP Eyman; Baltimore Ravens coaching fellowship – Prentice Gill; Baltimore Ravens coaching fellowship – Ian Kolste; Strength and conditioning: Strength and conditioning coordinator – Scott Elliott; Assistant strength and conditioning – Kaelyn Buskey; Assistant strength and conditioning – Kevin Hartman; Strength and conditioning – Ron Shrift; Strength and conditioning – Anthony Watson; Applied sports science – Connor Gorny; Director of high performance – Sam Rosengarten

== Final roster ==
2025 Baltimore Ravens roster
Quarterbacks (QB): 5 Tyler Huntley; 8 Lamar Jackson; 15 Cooper Rush; Running backs (RB): 26 Rasheen Ali; 22 Derrick Henry; 34 Keaton Mitchell; 42 Patrick Ricard; Wide receivers (WR): 7 Rashod Bateman; 4 Zay Flowers; 10 DeAndre Hopkins; 81 Devontez Walker; 16 Tylan Wallace; 83 LaJohntay Wester; Tight ends (TE): 89 Mark Andrews; 88 Charlie Kolar; 80 Isaiah Likely	Offensive linemen (OL): 67 Corey Bullock C/G; 77 Daniel Faalele G; 51 Emery Jones Jr. G; 64 Tyler Linderbaum C; 68 Joe Noteboom T; 70 Roger Rosengarten T; 79 Ronnie Stanley T; 71 Carson Vinson T; 72 Andrew Vorhees G; Defensive linemen (DL): 94 John Jenkins DE; 98 Travis Jones NT; 91 C. J. Okoye NT; 93 Aeneas Peebles DE; 97 Brent Urban DE	Linebackers (LB): 45 Mike Green OLB; 49 Jay Higgins ILB; 35 Jake Hummel ILB; 48 Carl Jones Jr. ILB; 41 Dre'Mont Jones OLB; 90 David Ojabo OLB; 95 Tavius Robinson OLB; 32 Trenton Simpson ILB; 0 Roquan Smith ILB; 53 Kyle Van Noy OLB; Defensive backs (DB): 3 Chidobe Awuzie CB; 12 Alohi Gilman FS; 14 Kyle Hamilton SS; 44 Marlon Humphrey CB; 39 Keondre Jackson SS; 38 Keyon Martin CB; 24 Malaki Starks FS; 27 T. J. Tampa CB; 29 Ar'Darius Washington FS; 2 Nate Wiggins CB; Special teams (ST): 33 Tyler Loop K; 46 Nick Moore LS; 11 Jordan Stout P	Practice squad: 78 Gerad Christian-Lichtenhan T; 76 Kenyon Green G; 59 Malik Hamm OLB; 86 Cornelius Johnson WR; 18 Keith Kirkwood WR; 57 William Kwenkeu ILB; 54 Chandler Martin ILB (PS/I); 65 David Olajiga DE (IPP); 36 Amani Oruwariye CB; 63 Jared Penning G; 28 Marquise Robinson CB; 56 Kaimon Rucker OLB; 47 Lucas Scott FB; 74 Laken Tomlinson G; 69 Josh Tupou NT; 30 Jonathan Ward RB; 85 Scotty Washington TE; Reserve: 58 Taven Bryan DE (IR); 40 Teddye Buchanan ILB (IR); 43 Justice Hill RB (IR); 50 Adisa Isaac OLB (IR); 31 Bilhal Kone CB (IR); 37 Robert Longerbeam CB (IR); 92 Nnamdi Madubuike DE (IR); 82 Dayton Wade WR (IR); 96 Broderick Washington DE (IR); Rookies in italics 53 active, 9 reserve, 16 practice squad (1 exempt)

=== Trades ===
2025 Baltimore Ravens trades
Team	Received	Compensation	Date
Los Angeles Chargers	S Alohi Gilman; 2026 NFL draft 5th round selection	OLB Odafe Oweh; 2027 NFL draft 7th round selection	October 7
Philadelphia Eagles	2026 NFL draft 6th round selection	CB Jaire Alexander; 2027 NFL draft 7th round selection	November 1
Tennessee Titans	OLB Dre'Mont Jones	2026 NFL draft 5th round selection	November 3

== Preseason ==
Week	Date	Opponent	Result	Record	Venue	Recap
1	August 7	Indianapolis Colts	W 24–16	1–0	M&T Bank Stadium	Recap
2	August 16	at Dallas Cowboys	W 31–13	2–0	AT&T Stadium	Recap
3	August 23	at Washington Commanders	W 30–3	3–0	Northwest Stadium	Recap

== Regular season ==
=== Schedule ===
Week	Date	Opponent	Result	Record	Venue	Recap
1	September 7	at Buffalo Bills	**L** 40–41	0–1	Highmark Stadium	Recap
2	September 14	**Cleveland Browns**	**W** 41–17	1–1	M&T Bank Stadium	Recap
3	September 22	Detroit Lions	**L** 30–38	1–2	M&T Bank Stadium	Recap
4	September 28	at Kansas City Chiefs	**L** 20–37	1–3	Arrowhead Stadium	Recap
5	October 5	Houston Texans	**L** 10–44	1–4	M&T Bank Stadium	Recap
6	October 12	Los Angeles Rams	**L** 3–17	1–5	M&T Bank Stadium	Recap
7	Bye					
8	October 26	Chicago Bears	**W** 30–16	2–5	M&T Bank Stadium	Recap
9	October 30	at Miami Dolphins	**W** 28–6	3–5	Hard Rock Stadium	Recap
10	November 9	at Minnesota Vikings	**W** 27–19	4–5	U.S. Bank Stadium	Recap
11	November 16	at **Cleveland Browns**	**W** 23–16	5–5	Huntington Bank Field	Recap
12	November 23	New York Jets	**W** 23–10	6–5	M&T Bank Stadium	Recap
13	November 27	**Cincinnati Bengals**	**L** 14–32	6–6	M&T Bank Stadium	Recap
14	December 7	**Pittsburgh Steelers**	**L** 22–27	6–7	M&T Bank Stadium	Recap
15	December 14	at **Cincinnati Bengals**	**W** 24–0	7–7	Paycor Stadium	Recap
16	December 21	New England Patriots	**L** 24–28	7–8	M&T Bank Stadium	Recap
17	December 27	at Green Bay Packers	**W** 41–24	8–8	Lambeau Field	Recap
18	January 4	at **Pittsburgh Steelers**	**L** 24–26	8–9	Acrisure Stadium	Recap

Note: Intra-division opponents are in bold text.

=== Game summaries ===
==== Week 1: Buffalo Bills 41, Baltimore Ravens 40 ====
Week 1: Baltimore Ravens at Buffalo Bills – Game summary

Quarter	1	2	3	4	Total
Ravens	3	17	14	6	**40**
**Bills**	7	6	6	22	**41**

at Highmark Stadium, Orchard Park, New York

- Date: September 7
- Game time: 8:20 p.m. EDT
- Game weather: Partly cloudy, 58 °F (14 °C)
- Game attendance: 70,745
- Referee: John Hussey
- TV announcers (NBC): Mike Tirico, Cris Collinsworth and Melissa Stark
- Recap, Game Book

Game information

**First quarter**

- BUF – Dalton Kincaid 15-yard pass from Josh Allen (Matt Prater kick), 11:19. Bills 7–0. **Drive: 7 plays, 50 yards, 3:41.**
- BAL – Tyler Loop 52-yard field goal, 3:38. Bills 7–3. **Drive: 12 plays, 35 yards, 7:41.**

**Second quarter**

- BAL – Derrick Henry 30-yard rush (Tyler Loop kick), 13:35. Ravens 10–7. **Drive: 6 plays, 85 yards, 3:04.**
- BAL – Lamar Jackson 10-yard rush (Tyler Loop kick), 9:47. Ravens 17–7. **Drive: 4 plays, 69 yards, 2:16.**
- BUF – Matt Prater 25-yard field goal, 2:50. Ravens 17–10. **Drive: 13 plays, 63 yards, 6:57.**
- BAL – Tyler Loop 49-yard field goal, 0:31. Ravens 20–10. **Drive: 8 plays, 23 yards, 2:19.**
- BUF – Matt Prater 43-yard field goal, 0:00. Ravens 20–13. **Drive: 4 plays, 48 yards, 0:31.**

**Third quarter**

- BAL – Zay Flowers 23-yard pass from Lamar Jackson (Tyler Loop kick), 12:48. Ravens 27–13. **Drive: 4 plays, 65 yards, 2:12.**
- BUF – James Cook 2-yard rush (pass failed), 7:47. Ravens 27–19. **Drive: 9 plays, 60 yards, 5:01.**
- BAL – DeAndre Hopkins 29-yard pass from Lamar Jackson (Tyler Loop kick), 1:09. Ravens 34–19. **Drive: 3 plays, 68 yards, 1:33.**

**Fourth quarter**

- BUF – Josh Allen 2-yard rush (pass failed), 12:51. Ravens 34–25. **Drive: 8 plays, 84 yards, 3:18.**
- BAL – Derrick Henry 46-yard rush (kick wide right), 11:42. Ravens 40–25. **Drive: 4 plays, 65 yards, 1:09.**
- BUF – Keon Coleman 10-yard pass from Josh Allen (Matt Prater kick), 3:56. Ravens 40–32. **Drive: 10 plays, 80 yards, 3:20.**
- BUF – Josh Allen 1-yard rush (pass failed), 1:58. Ravens 40–38. **Drive: 4 plays, 30 yards, 1:08.**
- BUF – Matt Prater 32-yard field goal, 0:00. Bills 41–40. **Drive: 9 plays, 66 yards, 1:26.**

**Top passers**

- BAL – Lamar Jackson – 14/19, 209 yards, 2 TD
- BUF – Josh Allen – 33/46, 394 yards, 2 TD

**Top rushers**

- BAL – Derrick Henry – 18 rushes, 169 yards, 2 TD
- BUF – James Cook – 13 rushes, 44 yards, TD

**Top receivers**

- BAL – Zay Flowers – 7 receptions, 143 yards, TD
- BUF – Keon Coleman – 8 receptions, 112 yards, TD

In a rematch of last season's AFC Divisional Playoffs, the Ravens squandered strong performances by running back Derrick Henry and receiver Zay Flowers, blowing a 40–25 lead in the fourth quarter as they lost to Josh Allen and the Bills, 41–40, on a 32-yard last-second field goal by Matt Prater. The Ravens were unable to overcome two three-and-outs and a Henry fumble on their last three drives, in addition to 250 passing yards and three touchdowns by Allen in the fourth quarter alone. With the loss, their first regular season loss in Buffalo since 2013, the Ravens started their season 0–1 for the second consecutive season. This was also the first time the Ravens started 0–1 in back-to-back seasons since 2015, as well as the first time an NFL team had lost after scoring 40 or more points and rushing for over 235 yards. This was the first game to end in a 41–40 final score.

==== Week 2: Baltimore Ravens 41, Cleveland Browns 17 ====
Week 2: Cleveland Browns at Baltimore Ravens – Game summary

Quarter	1	2	3	4	Total
Browns	0	3	7	7	**17**
**Ravens**	3	7	10	21	**41**

at M&T Bank Stadium, Baltimore, Maryland

- Date: September 14
- Game time: 1:00 p.m. EDT
- Game weather: Clear, 82 °F (28 °C)
- Game attendance: 70,487
- Referee: Brad Allen
- TV announcers (CBS): Tom McCarthy, Ross Tucker and Amanda Balionis
- Recap, Game Book

Game information

**First quarter**

- BAL – Tyler Loop 43-yard field goal, 3:06. Ravens 3–0. **Drive: 8 plays, 24 yards, 3:39.**

**Second quarter**

- BAL – Tylan Wallace 15-yard pass from Lamar Jackson (Tyler Loop kick), 11:13. Ravens 10–0. **Drive: 2 plays, 24 yards, 0:53.**
- CLE – Andre Szmyt 38-yard field goal, 0:29. Ravens 10–3. **Drive: 7 plays, 28 yards, 1:24.**

**Third quarter**

- BAL – Tyler Loop 32-yard field goal, 12:26. Ravens 13–3. **Drive: 7 plays, 51 yards, 2:34.**
- BAL – Devontez Walker 2-yard pass from Lamar Jackson (Tyler Loop kick), 10:09. Ravens 20–3. **Drive: 4 plays, 5 yards, 1:20.**
- CLE – Cedric Tillman 18-yard pass from Joe Flacco (Andre Szmyt kick), 5:02. Ravens 20–10. **Drive: 11 plays, 71 yards, 5:07.**

**Fourth quarter**

- BAL – Devontez Walker 24-yard pass from Lamar Jackson (Tyler Loop kick), 13:26. Ravens 27–10. **Drive: 10 plays, 66 yards, 6:36.**
- BAL – Roquan Smith 64-yard fumble return (Tyler Loop kick), 8:18. Ravens 34–10.
- BAL – DeAndre Hopkins 23-yard pass from Lamar Jackson (Tyler Loop kick), 4:43. Ravens 41–10. **Drive: 3 plays, 36 yards, 1:34.**
- CLE – Dylan Sampson 8-yard pass from Dillon Gabriel (Andre Szmyt kick), 1:50. Ravens 41–17. **Drive: 7 plays, 65 yards, 2:53.**

**Top passers**

- CLE – Joe Flacco – 25/45, 199 yards, TD, INT
- BAL – Lamar Jackson – 19/29, 225 yards, 4 TD

**Top rushers**

- CLE – Quinshon Judkins – 10 rushes, 61 yards
- BAL – Derrick Henry – 11 rushes, 24 yards

**Top receivers**

- CLE – Jerry Jeudy – 4 receptions, 51 yards
- BAL – Zay Flowers – 7 receptions, 75 yards

The Ravens faced their former quarterback Joe Flacco in Baltimore for the first time (the prior meeting was against the New York Jets on the road). After a sluggish first half, the Ravens dominated the second half and blew out the Browns 41–17. Baltimore's defense swarmed Flacco, who finished 25-of-45 for 199 yards with a touchdown, an interception, and a fumble, which was returned for a touchdown. Meanwhile, quarterback Lamar Jackson threw for 225 yards and four touchdowns. With the win, the Ravens rebounded from the disappointing loss the previous week and improved to 1–1.

==== Week 3: Detroit Lions 38, Baltimore Ravens 30 ====
Week 3: Detroit Lions at Baltimore Ravens – Game summary

Quarter	1	2	3	4	Total
**Lions**	7	7	7	17	**38**
Ravens	7	7	7	9	**30**

at M&T Bank Stadium, Baltimore, Maryland

- Date: September 22
- Game time: 8:15 p.m. EDT
- Game weather: Clear, 73 °F (23 °C)
- Game attendance: 70,642
- Referee: Bill Vinovich
- TV announcers (ESPN/ABC): Joe Buck, Troy Aikman, Lisa Salters, and Laura Rutledge
- Recap, Game Book

Game information

**First quarter**

- DET – Jahmyr Gibbs 1-yard run (Jake Bates kick), 9:16. Lions 7–0. **Drive: 11 plays, 67 yards, 5:44.**
- BAL – Derrick Henry 28-yard run (Tyler Loop kick), 5:40. Tied 7–7. **Drive: 6 plays, 80 yards, 3:36.**

**Second quarter**

- DET – David Montgomery 1-yard run (Jake Bates kick), 5:55. Lions 14–7. **Drive: 18 plays, 98 yards, 10:48.**
- BAL – Rashod Bateman 3-yard pass from Lamar Jackson (Tyler Loop kick), 0:24. Tied 14–14. **Drive: 4 plays, 49 yards, 0:32.**

**Third quarter**

- BAL – Mark Andrews 14-yard pass from Lamar Jackson (Tyler Loop kick), 8:51. Ravens 21–14. **Drive: 11 plays, 73 yards, 6:09.**
- DET – Amon-Ra St. Brown 18-yard pass from Jared Goff (Jake Bates kick), 5:13. Tied 21–21. **Drive: 7 plays, 60 yards, 3:38.**

**Fourth quarter**

- DET – Jahmyr Gibbs 4-yard run (Jake Bates kick), 14:55. Lions 28–21. **Drive: 7 plays, 96 yards, 3:41.**
- BAL – Tyler Loop 41-yard field goal, 9:40. Lions 28–24. **Drive: 10 plays, 49 yards, 5:15.**
- DET – Jake Bates 45-yard field goal, 6:35. Lions 31–24. **Drive: 4 plays, -11 yards, 1:51.**
- DET – David Montgomery 31-yard run (Jake Bates kick), 1:42. Lions 38–24. **Drive: 7 plays, 70 yards, 2:42.**
- BAL – Mark Andrews 27-yard pass from Lamar Jackson (pass failed), 0:29. Lions 38–30. **Drive: 6 plays, 65 yards, 1:13.**

**Top passers**

- DET – Jared Goff – 20/28, 202 yards, TD
- BAL – Lamar Jackson – 21/27, 288 yards, 3 TD

**Top rushers**

- DET – David Montgomery – 12 rushes, 151 yards, 2 TD
- BAL – Derrick Henry – 12 rushes, 50 yards, TD

**Top receivers**

- DET – Amon-Ra St. Brown – 7 receptions, 77 yards, TD
- BAL – Mark Andrews – 6 receptions, 91 yards, 2 TD

For the first time in team history, the Ravens lost to the Lions at home, and it was also their first loss to them since 2005. Lamar Jackson was sacked seven times, and Derrick Henry had a critical lost fumble in the 4th quarter with the Ravens trailing 24–28, his third lost fumble in as many games. With the upset loss, the Ravens fell to 1–2 for the second consecutive season.

==== Week 4: Kansas City Chiefs 37, Baltimore Ravens 20 ====
Week 4: Baltimore Ravens at Kansas City Chiefs – Game summary

Quarter	1	2	3	4	Total
Ravens	7	3	3	7	**20**
**Chiefs**	3	17	10	7	**37**

at Arrowhead Stadium, Kansas City, Missouri

- Date: September 28
- Game time: 4:25 p.m. EDT/3:25 p.m. CDT
- Game weather: Sunny, 89 °F (32 °C)
- Game attendance: 73,552
- Referee: Clay Martin
- TV announcers (CBS): Jim Nantz, Tony Romo and Tracy Wolfson
- Recap, Game Book

Game information

**First quarter**

- BAL – Justice Hill 11-yard pass from Lamar Jackson (Tyler Loop kick), 9:35. Ravens 7–0. **Drive: 9 plays, 70 yards, 5:25.**
- KC – Harrison Butker 38-yard field goal, 5:40. Ravens 7–3. **Drive: 9 plays, 48 yards, 3:55.**

**Second quarter**

- KC – Harrison Butker 23-yard field goal, 10:00. Ravens 7–6. **Drive: 14 plays, 79 yards, 6:44.**
- KC – JuJu Smith-Schuster 4-yard pass from Patrick Mahomes (Harrison Butker kick), 4:00. Chiefs 13–7. **Drive: 5 plays, 56 yards, 2:46.**
- KC – Isiah Pacheco 8-yard pass from Patrick Mahomes (Harrison Butker kick), 1:41. Chiefs 20–7. **Drive: 6 plays, 40 yards, 1:16.**
- BAL – Tyler Loop 43-yard field goal, 0:00. Chiefs 20–10. **Drive: 5 plays, 29 yards, 0:26.**

**Third quarter**

- KC – Tyquan Thornton 11-yard pass from Patrick Mahomes (Harrison Butker kick), 11:51. Chiefs 27–10. **Drive: 6 plays, 65 yards, 3:09.**
- BAL – Tyler Loop 32-yard field goal, 7:22. Chiefs 27–13. **Drive: 8 plays, 56 yards, 4:29.**
- KC – Harrison Butker 31-yard field goal, 1:06. Chiefs 30–13. **Drive: 10 plays, 39 yards, 6:16.**

**Fourth quarter**

- KC – Hollywood Brown 15-yard pass from Patrick Mahomes (Harrison Butker kick), 13:15. Chiefs 37–13. **Drive: 4 plays, 24 yards, 1:06.**
- BAL – Justice Hill 71-yard run (Tyler Loop kick), 1:56. Chiefs 37–20. **Drive: 3 plays, 86 yards, 1:33.**

**Top passers**

- BAL – Lamar Jackson – 14/20, 147 yards, TD, INT
- KC – Patrick Mahomes – 25/37, 270 yards, 4 TD

**Top rushers**

- BAL – Justice Hill – 3 rushes, 76 yards, TD
- KC – Xavier Worthy – 2 rushes, 38 yards

**Top receivers**

- BAL – Zay Flowers – 7 receptions, 74 yards
- KC – Xavier Worthy – 5 receptions, 83 yards

Baltimore entered the matchup against Kansas City without a total of six defensive starters. Baltimore scored the game's first set of points with a touchdown to Justice Hill, but the team could never control the game. Backup quarterback Cooper Rush entered the game in the fourth quarter with Lamar Jackson suffering a hamstring injury.

With a poor performance against the Chiefs, the Ravens dropped to 1–3, their first such start since 2015. They fell to 1–6 against the Chiefs since 2018.

==== Week 5: Houston Texans 44, Baltimore Ravens 10 ====
Week 5: Houston Texans at Baltimore Ravens – Game summary

Quarter	1	2	3	4	Total
**Texans**	7	17	10	10	**44**
Ravens	3	0	7	0	**10**

at M&T Bank Stadium, Baltimore, Maryland

- Date: October 5
- Game time: 1:00 p.m. EDT
- Game weather: Sunny, 78 °F (26 °C)
- Game attendance: 70,077
- Referee: Land Clark
- TV announcers (CBS): Ian Eagle, J. J. Watt and Evan Washburn
- Recap, Game Book

Game information

**First quarter**

- HOU – Xavier Hutchinson 5-yard pass from C. J. Stroud (Ka'imi Fairbairn kick), 9:24. Texans 7–0. **Drive: 10 plays, 67 yards, 5:36.**
- BAL – Tyler Loop 27-yard field goal, 1:58. Texans 7–3. **Drive: 12 plays, 66 yards, 7:26.**

**Second quarter**

- HOU – Ka'imi Fairbairn 50-yard field goal, 11:18. Texans 10–3. **Drive: 10 plays, 37 yards, 5:40.**
- HOU – Nico Collins 10-yard pass from C. J. Stroud (Ka'imi Fairbairn kick), 5:36. Texans 17–3. **Drive: 6 plays, 41 yards, 3:46.**
- HOU – Xavier Hutchinson 10-yard pass from C. J. Stroud (Ka'imi Fairbairn kick), 0:28. Texans 24–3. **Drive: 8 plays, 77 yards, 3:32.**

**Third quarter**

- HOU – Nick Chubb 27-yard run (Ka'imi Fairbairn kick), 11:33. Texans 31–3. **Drive: 3 plays, 38 yards, 1:16.**
- HOU – Ka'imi Fairbairn 57-yard field goal, 5:53. Texans 34–3. **Drive: 7 plays, 32 yards, 3:31.**
- BAL – Derrick Henry 1-yard run (Tyler Loop kick), 2:41. Texans 34–10. **Drive: 5 plays, 71 yards, 3:12.**

**Fourth quarter**

- HOU – Jaylin Noel 4-yard pass from C. J. Stroud (Ka'imi Fairbairn kick), 13:48. Texans 41–10. **Drive: 7 plays, 65 yards, 3:53.**
- HOU – Ka'imi Fairbairn 34-yard field goal, 10:30. Texans 44–10. **Drive: 4 plays, 5 yards, 1:40.**

**Top passers**

- HOU – C. J. Stroud – 23/27, 244 yards, 4 TD
- BAL – Cooper Rush – 14/20, 179 yards, 3 INT

**Top rushers**

- HOU – Nick Chubb – 11 rushes, 61 yards, TD
- BAL – Derrick Henry – 15 rushes, 33 yards, TD

**Top receivers**

- HOU – Christian Kirk – 4 receptions, 64 yards
- BAL – Zay Flowers – 5 receptions, 72 yards

With Lamar Jackson out with that hamstring injury, Baltimore was thoroughly dominated throughout the game, being outplayed in all phases. On the opening drive, the Ravens allowed C. J. Stroud and the Texans to score their first offensive touchdown against them, having failed to score one in each of the previous three meetings. The Ravens lost 44–10, ending a six-game winning streak against Houston and suffering their first home loss to the Texans in franchise history. The 34-point margin tied the worst home loss in Ravens history, equaling a 41–7 defeat to the New England Patriots in 2013.

With the loss, the Ravens fell to 1–4, marking their worst start to a season since the 2015 season.

==== Week 6: Los Angeles Rams 17, Baltimore Ravens 3 ====
Week 6: Los Angeles Rams at Baltimore Ravens – Game summary

Quarter	1	2	3	4	Total
**Rams**	0	3	14	0	**17**
Ravens	3	0	0	0	**3**

at M&T Bank Stadium, Baltimore, Maryland

- Date: October 12
- Game time: 1:00 p.m. EDT
- Game weather: Cloudy, 64 °F (18 °C)
- Game attendance: 70,055
- Referee: Alex Kemp
- TV announcers (Fox): Kevin Burkhardt, Tom Brady, Erin Andrews and Tom Rinaldi
- Recap, Game Book

Game information

**First quarter**

- BAL – Tyler Loop 37-yard field goal, 7:22. Ravens 3–0. **Drive: 12 plays, 53 yards, 7:38.**

**Second quarter**

- LAR – Joshua Karty 36-yard field goal, 9:50. Tied 3–3. **Drive: 12 plays, 48 yards, 4:21.**

**Third quarter**

- LAR – Kyren Williams 3-yard run (Joshua Karty kick), 11:52. Rams 10–3. **Drive: 9 plays, 76 yards, 3:08.**
- LAR – Tyler Higbee 8-yard pass from Matthew Stafford (Joshua Karty kick), 10:20. Rams 17–3. **Drive: 2 plays, 21 yards, 0:40.**

**Fourth quarter**

- No scoring plays

**Top passers**

- LAR – Matthew Stafford – 17/26, 181 yards, TD
- BAL – Cooper Rush – 11/19, 72 yards, INT

**Top rushers**

- LAR – Kyren Williams – 13 rushes, 50 yards, TD
- BAL – Derrick Henry – 24 rushes, 122 yards

**Top receivers**

- LAR – Tyler Higbee – 4 receptions, 40 yards, TD
- BAL – Zay Flowers – 6 receptions, 46 yards

After giving up nearly 40 points per game in their previous 3 games, the Ravens defense held the Rams to just 17 points. However, neither back-up quarterbacks Cooper Rush nor Tyler Huntley could generate any momentum as the offense floundered, scoring only 3 points. With their fourth straight loss, their longest such streak since 2021, the Ravens fell to 1–5 for the first time since 2015.

==== Week 8: Baltimore Ravens 30, Chicago Bears 16 ====
Week 8: Chicago Bears at Baltimore Ravens – Game summary

Quarter	1	2	3	4	Total
Bears	6	0	0	10	**16**
**Ravens**	0	10	6	14	**30**

at M&T Bank Stadium, Baltimore, Maryland

- Date: October 26
- Game time: 1:00 p.m. EDT
- Game weather: Clear, 60 °F (16 °C)
- Game attendance: 70,045
- Referee: Shawn Smith
- TV announcers (CBS): Ian Eagle, J. J. Watt and Evan Washburn
- Recap, Game Book

Game information

**First quarter**

- CHI – Cairo Santos 32-yard field goal, 6:50. Bears 3–0. **Drive: 13 plays, 64 yards, 8:10.**
- CHI – Cairo Santos 39-yard field goal, 0:03. Bears 6–0. **Drive: 11 plays, 61 yards, 4:31.**

**Second quarter**

- BAL – Derrick Henry 2-yard run (Tyler Loop kick), 8:15. Ravens 7–6. **Drive: 12 plays, 62 yards, 6:48.**
- BAL – Tyler Loop 42-yard field goal, 1:06. Ravens 10–6. **Drive: 12 plays, 54 yards, 5:27.**

**Third quarter**

- BAL – Tyler Loop 28-yard field goal, 10:05. Ravens 13–6. **Drive: 8 plays, 56 yards, 4:55.**
- BAL – Tyler Loop 32-yard field goal, 3:35. Ravens 16–6. **Drive: 10 plays, 76 yards, 4:22.**

**Fourth quarter**

- CHI – D'Andre Swift 2-yard rush (Cairo Santos kick), 12:22. Ravens 16–13. **Drive: 11 plays, 83 yards, 6:13.**
- BAL – Charlie Kolar 10-yard pass from Tyler Huntley (Tyler Loop kick), 8:13. Ravens 23–13. **Drive: 2 plays, 9 yards, 0:47.**
- CHI – Cairo Santos 47-yard field goal, 5:06. Ravens 23–16. **Drive: 10 plays, 48 yards, 3:07.**
- BAL – Derrick Henry 2-yard run (Tyler Loop kick), 2:09. Ravens 30–16. **Drive: 9 plays, 66 yards, 2:57.**

**Top passers**

- CHI – Caleb Williams – 25/38, 285 yards, INT
- BAL – Tyler Huntley – 17/22, 186 yards, TD

**Top rushers**

- CHI – D'Andre Swift – 11 rushes, 45 yards, TD
- BAL – Derrick Henry – 21 rushes, 71 yards, 2 TD

**Top receivers**

- CHI – Rome Odunze – 7 receptions, 114 yards
- BAL – Zay Flowers – 7 receptions, 63 yards

With the win, the Ravens snapped their 4-game losing streak to improve to 2–5 and they avoided their first 1–6 start since 2015.

==== Week 9: Baltimore Ravens 28, Miami Dolphins 6 ====
Week 9: Baltimore Ravens at Miami Dolphins – Game summary

Quarter	1	2	3	4	Total
**Ravens**	7	7	14	0	**28**
Dolphins	3	3	0	0	**6**

at Hard Rock Stadium, Miami Gardens, Florida

- Date: October 30
- Game time: 8:15 p.m. EDT
- Game weather: Clear, 73 °F (23 °C)
- Game attendance: 66,132
- Referee: Scott Novak
- TV announcers (WMAR/Prime Video): Al Michaels, Kirk Herbstreit and Kaylee Hartung
- Recap, Game Book

Game information

**First quarter**

- MIA – Riley Patterson 49-yard field goal, 12:07. Dolphins 3–0. **Drive: 5 plays, 26 yards, 2:53.**
- BAL – Mark Andrews 2-yard pass from Lamar Jackson (Tyler Loop kick), 8:25. Ravens 7–3. **Drive: 4 plays, 7 yards, 1:10.**

**Second quarter**

- BAL – Mark Andrews 20-yard pass from Lamar Jackson (Tyler Loop kick), 14:10. Ravens 14–3. **Drive: 7 plays, 75 yards, 3:26.**
- MIA – Riley Patterson 43-yard field goal, 7:57. Ravens 14–6. **Drive: 4 plays, 4 yards, 0:52.**

**Third quarter**

- BAL – Charlie Kolar 3-yard pass from Lamar Jackson (Tyler Loop kick), 8:09. Ravens 21–6. **Drive: 11 plays, 68 yards, 6:51.**
- BAL – Rashod Bateman 9-yard pass from Lamar Jackson (Tyler Loop kick), 4:15. Ravens 28–6. **Drive: 4 plays, 60 yards, 2:08.**

**Fourth quarter**

- No scoring plays

**Top passers**

- BAL – Lamar Jackson – 18/23, 204 yards, 4 TD
- MIA – Tua Tagovailoa – 25/40, 261 yards, INT

**Top rushers**

- BAL – Derrick Henry – 19 rushes, 119 yards
- MIA – De'Von Achane – 14 rushes, 67 yards

**Top receivers**

- BAL – Zay Flowers – 5 receptions, 64 yards
- MIA – Jaylen Waddle – 6 receptions, 82 yards

Lamar Jackson returned as the team's starting quarterback for the first time since exiting in Week 4 against the Kansas City Chiefs. Jackson completed 18-of-23 passes for 204 yards and four touchdowns, leading the Ravens to a rout of the Miami Dolphins. With the victory, the Ravens dominated on the road and improved their record to 3–5.

==== Week 10: Baltimore Ravens 27, Minnesota Vikings 19 ====
Week 10: Baltimore Ravens at Minnesota Vikings – Game summary

Quarter	1	2	3	4	Total
**Ravens**	3	6	10	8	**27**
Vikings	7	3	3	6	**19**

at U.S. Bank Stadium, Minneapolis, Minnesota

- Date: November 9
- Game time: 1:00 p.m. EST/12:00 p.m. CST
- Game weather: None (indoor stadium)
- Game attendance: 66,946
- Referee: Shawn Hochuli
- TV announcers (Fox): Kevin Kugler, Daryl Johnston and Allison Williams
- Recap, Game Book

Game information

**First quarter**

- MIN – Aaron Jones 4-yard run (Will Reichard kick), 9:46. Vikings 7–0. **Drive: 7 plays, 86 yards, 3:27.**
- BAL – Tyler Loop 44-yard field goal, 4:25. Vikings 7–3. **Drive: 11 plays, 42 yards, 5:21.**

**Second quarter**

- MIN – Will Reichard 49-yard field goal, 10:56. Vikings 10–3. **Drive: 7 plays, 26 yards, 3:59.**
- BAL – Tyler Loop 28-yard field goal, 1:11. Vikings 10–6. **Drive: 10 plays, 68 yards, 5:36.**
- BAL – Tyler Loop 30-yard field goal, 0:02. Vikings 10–9. **Drive: 4 plays, 63 yards, 0:28.**

**Third quarter**

- BAL – Tyler Loop 22-yard field goal, 10:19. Ravens 12–10. **Drive: 6 plays, 67 yards, 2:22.**
- BAL – Justice Hill 1-yard run (Tyler Loop kick), 8:02. Ravens 19–10. **Drive: 6 plays, 23 yards, 2:11.**
- MIN – Will Reichard 43-yard field goal, 2:16. Ravens 19–13. **Drive: 7 plays, 29 yards, 2:39.**

**Fourth quarter**

- BAL – Mark Andrews 2-yard pass from Lamar Jackson (Lamar Jackson-Rashod Bateman pass), 10:40. Ravens 27–13. **Drive: 11 plays, 67 yards, 6:36.**
- MIN – Jalen Nailor 10-yard pass from J. J. McCarthy (pass failed), 3:23. Ravens 27–19. **Drive: 9 plays, 65 yards, 2:12.**

**Top passers**

- BAL – Lamar Jackson – 17/29, 176 yards, TD
- MIN – J. J. McCarthy – 20/42, 248 yards, TD, 2 INT

**Top rushers**

- BAL – Derrick Henry – 20 rushes, 75 yards
- MIN – J. J. McCarthy – 5 rushes, 48 yards

**Top receivers**

- BAL – Zay Flowers – 4 receptions, 75 yards
- MIN – Jalen Nailor – 5 receptions, 124 yards, TD

The Ravens defeated the Vikings in what marked Lamar Jackson's 100th regular-season start. The win also gave Baltimore its first road victory against Minnesota in franchise history, and John Harbaugh recorded at least one win in every current NFL city.

==== Week 11: Baltimore Ravens 23, Cleveland Browns 16 ====
Week 11: Baltimore Ravens at Cleveland Browns – Game summary

Quarter	1	2	3	4	Total
**Ravens**	3	7	0	13	**23**
Browns	3	13	0	0	**16**

at Huntington Bank Field, Cleveland, Ohio

- Date: November 16
- Game time: 4:25 p.m. EST
- Game weather: Cloudy, 44 °F (7 °C)
- Game attendance: 64,230
- Referee: Land Clark
- TV announcers (CBS): Andrew Catalon, Charles Davis, Jason McCourty and AJ Ross
- Recap, Game Book

Game information

**First quarter**

- BAL – Tyler Loop 25-yard field goal, 4:55. Ravens 3–0. **Drive: 15 plays, 72 yards, 7:41.**
- CLE – Andre Szmyt 30-yard field goal, 0:00. Tied 3–3. **Drive: 9 plays, 55 yards, 4:55.**

**Second quarter**

- CLE – Andre Szmyt 30-yard field goal, 8:44. Browns 6–3. **Drive: 4 plays, 0 yards, 1:32.**
- CLE – Devin Bush Jr. 23-yard interception return (Andre Szmyt kick), 7:43. Browns 13–3.
- BAL – Derrick Henry 1-yard run (Tyler Loop kick), 4:17. Browns 13–10. **Drive: 6 plays, 63 yards, 3:26.**
- CLE – Andre Szmyt 46-yard field goal, 0:58. Browns 16–10. **Drive: 8 plays, 42 yards, 3:19.**

**Third quarter**

- No scoring plays

**Fourth quarter**

- BAL – Tyler Loop 24-yard field goal, 14:06. Browns 16–13. **Drive: 5 plays, 63 yards, 1:56.**
- BAL – Tyler Loop 44-yard field goal, 4:59. Tied 16–16. **Drive: 10 plays, 54 yards, 5:50.**
- BAL – Mark Andrews 35-yard run (Tyler Loop kick), 2:31. Ravens 23–16. **Drive: 4 plays, 44 yards, 2:01.**

**Top passers**

- BAL – Lamar Jackson – 14/25, 193 yards, 2 INT
- CLE – Dillon Gabriel – 7/10, 68 yards

**Top rushers**

- BAL – Derrick Henry – 18 rushes, 103 yards, TD
- CLE – Quinshon Judkins – 17 rushes, 59 yards

**Top receivers**

- BAL – Zay Flowers – 3 receptions, 78 yards
- CLE – Cedric Tillman – 3 receptions, 52 yards

Although the Ravens entered the game as more than a touchdown favorite, the Browns led for much of the game. After tying the game at 16–16 with two field goals in the fourth quarter, Mark Andrews ran for a 35-yard go-ahead touchdown on a trick play on 4th-and-1 with 2:31 remaining, giving the Ravens the lead. The Browns attempted to make a comeback drive, but turned the ball over on downs after failing to convert a 4th-and-5 from the Baltimore 25-yard line with 0:57 remaining, securing the victory for Baltimore. This marked the Ravens’ first sweep of the Browns since the 2020 season, improving Baltimore's record to 5–5 on the year and 39–15 all-time against Cleveland. The Ravens also spoiled Shedeur Sanders’ debut; he finished 4-of-16 with an interception and a 13.5 passer rating after coming into the game in the third quarter due to Dillon Gabriel suffering an injury. He was also sacked twice as the Browns went scoreless in the second half.

Mark Andrews also became the Ravens’ career leader in receiving yards (5,806) during the game, surpassing wide receiver Derrick Mason’s previous franchise record of 5,777.

==== Week 12: Baltimore Ravens 23, New York Jets 10 ====
Week 12: New York Jets at Baltimore Ravens – Game summary

Quarter	1	2	3	4	Total
Jets	0	7	0	3	**10**
**Ravens**	0	3	14	6	**23**

at M&T Bank Stadium, Baltimore, Maryland

- Date: November 23
- Game time: 1:00 p.m. EST
- Game weather: Cloudy, 54 °F (12 °C)
- Game attendance: 70,029
- Referee: Clete Blakeman
- TV announcers (CBS): Andrew Catalon, Charles Davis, Jason McCourty and AJ Ross
- Recap, Game Book

Game information

**First quarter**

- No scoring plays

**Second quarter**

- NYJ – John Metchie 13-yard pass from Tyrod Taylor (Nick Folk kick), 4:04. Jets 7–0. **Drive: 12 plays, 79 yards, 6:29.**
- BAL – Tyler Loop 31-yard field goal, 1:35. Jets 7–3. **Drive: 8 plays, 45 yards, 2:29.**

**Third quarter**

- BAL – Derrick Henry 2-yard run (Tyler Loop kick), 8:49. Ravens 10–7. **Drive: 11 plays, 74 yards, 6:11.**
- BAL – Derrick Henry 2-yard run (Tyler Loop kick), 3:33. Ravens 17–7. **Drive: 7 plays, 42 yards, 3:05.**

**Fourth quarter**

- NYJ – Nick Folk 42-yard field goal, 14:41. Ravens 17–10. **Drive: 9 plays, 36 yards, 3:52.**
- BAL – Tyler Loop 35-yard field goal, 1:35. Ravens 20–10. **Drive: 9 plays, 58 yards, 5:08.**
- BAL – Tyler Loop 27-yard field goal, 0:41. Ravens 23–10. **Drive: 4 plays, 2 yards, 1:00.**

**Top passers**

- NYJ – Tyrod Taylor – 17/28, 222 yards, TD, INT
- BAL – Lamar Jackson – 13/23, 153 yards

**Top rushers**

- NYJ – Breece Hall – 16 rushes, 44 yards
- BAL – Derrick Henry – 21 rushes, 64 yards, 2 TD

**Top receivers**

- NYJ – Breece Hall – 4 receptions, 75 yards
- BAL – Zay Flowers – 5 receptions, 57 yards

Derrick Henry rushed for 64 yards on 21 carries, including two two-yard third-quarter touchdowns, as the Ravens overcame a sluggish start on offense in the first half to beat the Jets 23–10. With their fifth straight win, the Ravens improved to 6–5, the first time they had been over .500 this season, and moved into first place in the AFC North as the Pittsburgh Steelers lost to the Chicago Bears that same day.

==== Week 13: Cincinnati Bengals 32, Baltimore Ravens 14 ====
Thanksgiving Day games

Week 13: Cincinnati Bengals at Baltimore Ravens – Game summary

Quarter	1	2	3	4	Total
**Bengals**	3	9	14	6	**32**
Ravens	7	0	7	0	**14**

at M&T Bank Stadium, Baltimore, Maryland

- Date: November 27
- Game time: 8:20 p.m. EST
- Game weather: Clear, 38 °F (3 °C)
- Game attendance: 70,066
- Referee: Craig Wrolstad
- TV announcers (NBC): Mike Tirico, Jason Garrett and Melissa Stark
- Recap, Game Book

Game information

**First quarter**

- CIN – Evan McPherson 31-yard field goal, 9:39. Bengals 3–0. **Drive: 10 plays, 51 yards, 5:21.**
- BAL – Derrick Henry 28-yard run (Tyler Loop kick), 6:33. Ravens 7–3. **Drive: 7 plays, 69 yards, 3:06.**

**Second quarter**

- CIN – Evan McPherson 42-yard field goal, 11:24. Ravens 7–6. **Drive: 11 plays, 29 yards, 5:09.**
- CIN – Evan McPherson 24-yard field goal, 2:36. Bengals 9–7. **Drive: 11 plays, 74 yards, 5:46.**
- CIN – Evan McPherson 33-yard field goal, 0:10. Bengals 12–7. **Drive: 4 plays, 4 yards, 0:18.**

**Third quarter**

- CIN – Tanner Hudson 14-yard pass from Joe Burrow (Evan McPherson kick), 7:22. Bengals 19–7. **Drive: 10 plays, 61 yards, 5:26.**
- BAL – Keaton Mitchell 18-yard run (Tyler Loop kick), 3:59. Bengals 19–14. **Drive: 7 plays, 68 yards, 3:23.**
- CIN – Andrei Iosivas 29-yard pass from Joe Burrow (Evan McPherson kick), 0:15. Bengals 26–14. **Drive: 8 plays, 68 yards, 3:44.**

**Fourth quarter**

- CIN – Evan McPherson 52-yard field goal, 9:25. Bengals 29–14. **Drive: 47 plays, 19 yards, 3:29.**
- CIN – Evan McPherson 41-yard field goal, 1:06. Bengals 32–14. **Drive: 6 plays, 13 yards, 3:06.**

**Top passers**

- CIN – Joe Burrow – 24/46, 261 yards, 2 TD
- BAL – Lamar Jackson – 17/32, 246 yards, INT

**Top rushers**

- CIN – Chase Brown – 15 rushes, 78 yards
- BAL – Derrick Henry – 10 rushes, 60 yards, TD

**Top receivers**

- CIN – Ja'Marr Chase – 7 receptions, 110 yards
- BAL – Isaiah Likely – 5 receptions, 95 yards

The Ravens played a sloppy game and were absolutely dominated, committing four fumbles, including two by Lamar Jackson. Bengals quarterback Joe Burrow, making his return after suffering a turf toe injury in Week 2, threw for 261 yards and two touchdowns, contributing to a Ravens loss.

This was the Ravens' first Thanksgiving loss, making the Houston Texans the only team in the NFL with at least two Thanksgiving wins without a loss. It was also Baltimore's first since Thanksgiving game since 2013. They were originally scheduled to play on Thanksgiving in 2020, but the 2020 game was postponed due to a COVID-19 outbreak.

The game was also the most-watched Thanksgiving night game in NFL history with an average of 28.4 million viewers across NBC, Peacock, and Telemundo.

==== Week 14: Pittsburgh Steelers 27, Baltimore Ravens 22 ====
Week 14: Pittsburgh Steelers at Baltimore Ravens – Game summary

Quarter	1	2	3	4	Total
**Steelers**	7	10	10	0	**27**
Ravens	3	6	7	6	**22**

at M&T Bank Stadium, Baltimore, Maryland

- Date: December 7
- Game time: 1:00 p.m. EST
- Game weather: Cloudy, 44 °F (7 °C)
- Game attendance: 70,544
- Referee: Alex Moore
- TV announcers (CBS): Jim Nantz, Tony Romo and Tracy Wolfson
- Recap, Game Book

Game information

**First quarter**

- BAL – Tyler Loop 36-yard field goal, 10:58. Ravens 3–0. **Drive: 9 plays, 55 yards, 4:02.**
- PIT – Aaron Rodgers 1-yard run (Chris Boswell kick), 7:13. Steelers 7–3. **Drive: 8 plays, 65 yards, 3:45.**

**Second quarter**

- PIT – Chris Boswell 23-yard field goal, 10:39. Steelers 10–3. **Drive: 12 plays, 75 yards, 4:46.**
- PIT – Kenneth Gainwell 6-yard run (Chris Boswell kick), 6:05. Steelers 17–3. **Drive: 6 plays, 36 yards, 3:16.**
- BAL – Lamar Jackson 6-yard run (kick failed), 0:16. Steelers 17–9. **Drive: 13 plays, 60 yards, 5:49.**

**Third quarter**

- PIT – Chris Boswell 28-yard field goal, 10:57. Steelers 20–9. **Drive: 8 plays, 50 yards, 4:03.**
- BAL – Isaiah Likely 4-yard pass from Lamar Jackson (Tyler Loop kick), 7:35. Steelers 20–16. **Drive: 6 plays, 71 yards, 3:22.**
- PIT – Jaylen Warren 38-yard pass from Aaron Rodgers (Chris Boswell kick), 3:30. Steelers 27–16. **Drive: 6 plays, 80 yards, 4:05.**

**Fourth quarter**

- BAL – Tyler Loop 28-yard field goal, 13:43. Steelers 27–19. **Drive: 10 plays, 54 yards, 4:47.**
- BAL – Tyler Loop 36-yard field goal, 7:10. Steelers 27–22. **Drive: 9 plays, 50 yards, 4:09.**

**Top passers**

- PIT – Aaron Rodgers – 23/34, 284 yards, TD
- BAL – Lamar Jackson – 19/35, 219 yards, TD, INT

**Top rushers**

- PIT – Kenneth Gainwell – 4 rushes, 15 yards, TD
- BAL – Derrick Henry – 25 rushes, 94 yards

**Top receivers**

- PIT – DK Metcalf – 7 receptions, 148 yards
- BAL – Zay Flowers – 8 receptions, 124 yards

A controversial moment occurred when Isaiah Likely caught a pass from Lamar Jackson with both hands in the end zone, with both feet down. As he was about to take another step with his right foot, Steelers’ cornerback Joey Porter Jr. knocked the ball free. The play was initially ruled a touchdown but was later overturned to an incomplete pass. The Ravens eventually turned the ball over on downs.

The next day, Ravens guard Ben Cleveland was suspended for 3 games for violating the NFL's substance abuse policy.

==== Week 15: Baltimore Ravens 24, Cincinnati Bengals 0 ====
Week 15: Baltimore Ravens at Cincinnati Bengals – Game summary

Quarter	1	2	3	4	Total
**Ravens**	0	14	3	7	**24**
Bengals	0	0	0	0	**0**

at Paycor Stadium, Cincinnati, Ohio

- Date: December 14
- Game time: 1:00 p.m. EST
- Game weather: Sunny, 10 °F (−12 °C)
- Game attendance: 64,907
- Referee: Brad Allen
- TV announcers (CBS): Spero Dedes, Adam Archuleta and Aditi Kinkhabwala
- Recap, Game Book

Game information

**First quarter**

- No scoring plays

**Second quarter**

- BAL – Rasheen Ali 30-yard pass from Lamar Jackson (Tyler Loop kick), 4:35. Ravens 7–0. **Drive: 5 plays, 79 yards, 2:59.**
- BAL – Zay Flowers 28-yard pass from Lamar Jackson (Tyler Loop kick), 0:23. Ravens 14–0. **Drive: 5 plays, 80 yards, 0:42.**

**Third quarter**

- BAL – Tyler Loop 27-yard field goal, 9:05. Ravens 17–0. **Drive: 6 plays, 60 yards, 2:44.**

**Fourth quarter**

- BAL – Alohi Gilman lateral pass from Kyle Van Noy for 84 yard interception return (Tyler Loop kick), 7:38. Ravens 24–0.

**Top passers**

- BAL – Lamar Jackson – 8/12, 150 yards, 2 TD, INT
- CIN – Joe Burrow – 25/39, 225 yards, 2 INT

**Top rushers**

- BAL – Derrick Henry – 11 rushes, 100 yards
- CIN – Chase Brown – 13 rushes, 53 yards

**Top receivers**

- BAL – Zay Flowers – 3 receptions, 68 yards, TD
- CIN – Ja'Marr Chase – 10 receptions, 132 yards

The Ravens entered the game hoping to avenge their 32–14 Thanksgiving defeat to the Bengals. The Ravens would do so, as they never once trailed, and held the Bengals scoreless. The Ravens recorded their first shutout win since beating the Tennessee Titans 21–0 in the 2018 season. Also with the win, the Ravens improved to 7–7, and keeping their playoff hopes alive while ending those of the Bengals.

==== Week 16: New England Patriots 28, Baltimore Ravens 24 ====
Week 16: New England Patriots at Baltimore Ravens – Game summary

Quarter	1	2	3	4	Total
**Patriots**	0	10	3	15	**28**
Ravens	7	3	7	7	**24**

at M&T Bank Stadium, Baltimore, Maryland

- Date: December 21
- Game time: 8:20 p.m. EST
- Game weather: Clear, 40 °F (4 °C)
- Game attendance: 70,709
- Referee: Brad Rogers
- TV announcers (NBC): Mike Tirico, Cris Collinsworth, and Melissa Stark
- Recap, Game Book

Game information

**First quarter**

- BAL – Derrick Henry 21-yard run (Tyler Loop kick), 12:21. Ravens 7–0. **Drive: 5 plays, 65 yards, 2:39.**

**Second quarter**

- NE – Hunter Henry 1-yard pass from Drake Maye (Andres Borregales kick), 11:17. Tied 7–7. **Drive: 10 plays, 68 yards, 5:26.**
- NE – Andres Borregales 45-yard field goal, 5:39. Patriots 10–7. **Drive: 9 plays, 48 yards, 4:42.**
- BAL – Tyler Loop 36-yard field goal, 1:03. Tied 10–10. **Drive: 11 plays, 47 yards, 4:36.**

**Third quarter**

- NE – Andres Borregales 41-yard field goal, 7:43. Patriots 13–10. **Drive: 6 plays, 32 yards, 2:55.**
- BAL – Zay Flowers 18-yard run (Tyler Loop kick), 4:35. Ravens 17–13. **Drive: 6 plays, 65 yards, 3:08.**

**Fourth quarter**

- BAL – Derrick Henry 2-yard run (Tyler Loop kick), 12:50. Ravens 24–13. **Drive: 7 plays, 44 yards, 4:03.**
- NE – Kyle Williams 37-yard pass from Drake Maye (Drake Maye–Rhamondre Stevenson pass), 9:01. Ravens 24–21. **Drive: 7 plays, 73 yards, 3:49.**
- NE – Rhamondre Stevenson 21-yard run (Andres Borregales kick), 2:07. Patriots 28–24. **Drive: 9 plays, 89 yards, 2:55.**

**Top passers**

- NE – Drake Maye – 31/44, 380 yards, 2 TD, INT
- BAL – Lamar Jackson – 7/10, 101 yards

**Top rushers**

- NE – Rhamondre Stevenson – 8 rushes, 51 yards, TD
- BAL – Derrick Henry – 18 rushes, 128 yards, 2 TD

**Top receivers**

- NE – Stefon Diggs – 9 receptions, 138 yards
- BAL – Zay Flowers – 7 receptions, 84 yards

At the end of the first half, Lamar Jackson was taken out of the game with a back injury and was later ruled out. In the fourth quarter, Derrick Henry rushed for a touchdown to give the Ravens a 24–13 lead. However, that was the last time Henry touched the ball. Patriots quarterback Drake Maye then rallied the Patriots, throwing two touchdown passes to give New England a 28–24 lead. On Baltimore's next drive, Zay Flowers fumbled, and the Patriots ran out the clock to secure the win. With the loss, Baltimore fell to 7–8 (2–2 against the AFC East) and finished 3–6 at home. This also marked the 17th time the Ravens blew a multi possession lead since 2008.

==== Week 17: Baltimore Ravens 41, Green Bay Packers 24 ====
Week 17: Baltimore Ravens at Green Bay Packers – Game summary

Quarter	1	2	3	4	Total
**Ravens**	7	20	0	14	**41**
Packers	7	7	10	0	**24**

at Lambeau Field, Green Bay, Wisconsin

- Date: December 27
- Game time: 8:00 p.m. EST/7:00 p.m. CST
- Game weather: Cloudy, 36 °F (2 °C)
- Game attendance: 77,660
- Referee: Alan Eck
- TV announcers (Peacock): Noah Eagle, Todd Blackledge and Kathryn Tappen
- Recap, Game Book

Game information

**First quarter**

- BAL – Derrick Henry 3-yard rush (Tyler Loop kick), 6:55. Ravens 7–0. **Drive: 13 plays, 75 yards, 8:05.**
- GB – Christian Watson 39-yard pass from Malik Willis (Brandon McManus kick), 5:44. Tied 7–7. **Drive: 2 plays, 69 yards, 1:11.**

**Second quarter**

- BAL – Derrick Henry 1-yard rush (Tyler Loop kick), 13:13. Ravens 14–7. **Drive: 13 plays, 74 yards, 7:31.**
- BAL – Tyler Loop 22-yard field goal, 7:10. Ravens 17–7. **Drive: 8 plays, 30 yards, 4:10.**
- BAL – Tyler Loop 34-yard field goal, 3:36. Ravens 20–7. **Drive: 6 plays, 14 yards, 2:46.**
- GB – Malik Willis 22-yard rush (Brandon McManus kick), 1:24. Ravens 20–14. **Drive: 5 plays, 76 yards, 2:12.**
- BAL – Derrick Henry 3-yard rush (Tyler Loop kick), 0:10. Ravens 27–14. **Drive: 7 plays, 65 yards, 1:14.**

**Third quarter**

- GB – Brandon McManus 24-yard field goal, 9:10. Ravens 27–17. **Drive: 11 plays, 68 yards, 5:50.**
- GB – Malik Willis 11-yard rush (Brandon McManus kick), 2:02. Ravens 27–24. **Drive: 7 plays, 86 yards, 2:59.**

**Fourth quarter**

- BAL – Zay Flowers 10-yard pass from Tyler Huntley (Tyler Loop kick), 10:10. Ravens 34–24. **Drive: 12 plays, 85 yards, 6:52.**
- BAL – Derrick Henry 25-yard rush (Tyler Loop kick), 1:56. Ravens 41–24. **Drive: 10 plays, 68 yards, 5:00.**

**Top passers**

- BAL – Tyler Huntley – 16/20, 109 yards, TD
- GB – Malik Willis – 18/21, 288 yards, TD

**Top rushers**

- BAL – Derrick Henry – 36 rushes, 216 yards, 4 TD
- GB – Malik Willis – 9 rushes, 60 yards, 2 TD

**Top receivers**

- BAL – Zay Flowers – 4 receptions, 30 yards, TD
- GB – Christian Watson – 5 receptions, 113 yards, TD

Derrick Henry recorded one of his best performances of the season, rushing for a career-high 216 yards on 36 carries and scoring four touchdowns to lead the Ravens to a victory over the Packers. With the upset win, the Ravens improved to 8–8 while finishing 3–1 against the NFC North and 3–2 against the NFC overall.

Following the Steelers' loss to the Browns on Sunday, the outcome set up a winner-take-all matchup in the season finale to determine the AFC North champion.

==== Week 18: Pittsburgh Steelers 26, Baltimore Ravens 24 ====
Week 18: Baltimore Ravens at Pittsburgh Steelers – Game summary

Quarter	1	2	3	4	Total
Ravens	7	3	0	14	**24**
**Steelers**	0	3	10	13	**26**

at Acrisure Stadium, Pittsburgh, Pennsylvania

- Date: January 4
- Game time: 8:20 p.m. EST
- Game weather: Cloudy, 25 °F (−4 °C)
- Game attendance: 65,400
- Referee: Shawn Smith
- TV announcers (NBC): Mike Tirico, Cris Collinsworth and Melissa Stark
- Recap, Game Book

Game information

**First quarter**

- BAL – Devontez Walker 38-yard pass from Lamar Jackson (Tyler Loop kick), 10:54. Ravens 7–0. **Drive: 8 plays, 85 yards, 4:06.**

**Second quarter**

- BAL – Tyler Loop 40-yard field goal, 13:33. Ravens 10–0. **Drive: 6 plays, 23 yards, 3:09.**
- PIT – Chris Boswell 57-yard field goal, 8:52. Ravens 10–3. **Drive: 8 plays, 36 yards, 4:41.**

**Third quarter**

- PIT – Connor Heyward 1-yard run (Chris Boswell kick), 8:23. Tied 10–10. **Drive: 12 plays, 67 yards, 6:37.**
- PIT – Chris Boswell 25-yard field goal, 4:28. Steelers 13–10. **Drive: 6 plays, 19 yards, 2:57.**

**Fourth quarter**

- BAL – Zay Flowers 50-yard pass from Lamar Jackson (Tyler Loop kick), 8:42. Ravens 17–13. **Drive: 4 plays, 71 yards, 2:10.**
- PIT – Kenneth Gainwell 2-yard run (Chris Boswell kick), 3:49. Steelers 20–17. **Drive: 8 plays, 60 yards, 4:53.**
- BAL – Zay Flowers 64-yard pass from Lamar Jackson (Tyler Loop kick), 2:20. Ravens 24–20. **Drive: 3 plays, 73 yards, 1:29.**
- PIT – Calvin Austin III 26-yard pass from Aaron Rodgers (kick failed), 0:55. Steelers 26–24. **Drive: 6 plays, 65 yards, 1:25.**

**Top passers**

- BAL – Lamar Jackson – 11/18, 238 yards, 3 TD, INT
- PIT – Aaron Rodgers – 31/47, 294 yards, TD

**Top rushers**

- BAL – Derrick Henry – 20 rushes, 126 yards
- PIT – Jaylen Warren – 14 rushes, 66 yards

**Top receivers**

- BAL – Zay Flowers – 4 receptions, 138 yards, 2 TD
- PIT – Kenneth Gainwell – 8 receptions, 64 yards

Despite a late rally, Tyler Loop missed the game-winning field goal when time expired, which denied the Ravens a chance to win a third straight AFC North title. As a result, the Ravens were swept by the Steelers for the fourth time in six years, as well as them clinching their first losing season since 2021. Baltimore ended their season at 8–9 (3–3 against the AFC North) and 5–3 on the road. Also with the loss, the Ravens were eliminated from playoff contention. This would prove to be John Harbaugh's final game as head coach for Baltimore, as he was dismissed two days later.

=== Standings ===
==== Division ====
AFC North
	W	L	T	PCT	DIV	CONF	PF	PA	STK
^{(4)} Pittsburgh Steelers	10	7	0	.588	4–2	8–4	397	387	W1
Baltimore Ravens	8	9	0	.471	3–3	5–7	424	398	L1
Cincinnati Bengals	6	11	0	.353	3–3	5–7	414	492	L1
Cleveland Browns	5	12	0	.294	2–4	4–8	279	379	W2

==== Conference ====
AFC
Seed	Team	Division	W	L	T	PCT	DIV	CONF	SOS	SOV	STK
**Division leaders**
1 (Note: Denver finished ahead of New England based on common games (Denver 6–0 to New England 5–1 against: Cincinnati, Las Vegas, NY Giants, NY Jets and Tennessee).)	Denver Broncos	West	14	3	0	.824	5–1	9–3	.422	.378	W2
2	New England Patriots	East	14	3	0	.824	5–1	9–3	.391	.370	W3
3	Jacksonville Jaguars	South	13	4	0	.765	5–1	10–2	.478	.425	W8
4	Pittsburgh Steelers	North	10	7	0	.588	4–2	8–4	.503	.453	W1
**Wild cards**
5 (Note: Houston finished ahead of Buffalo based on head-to-head victory.)	Houston Texans	South	12	5	0	.706	5–1	10–2	.522	.441	W9
6	Buffalo Bills	East	12	5	0	.706	4–2	9–3	.471	.412	W1
7	Los Angeles Chargers	West	11	6	0	.647	5–1	8–4	.469	.425	L2
**Did not qualify for the postseason**
8 (Note: Indianapolis finished ahead of Baltimore based on conference record (Indianapolis 6–6 to Baltimore 5–7).)	Indianapolis Colts	South	8	9	0	.471	2–4	6–6	.540	.382	L7
9	Baltimore Ravens	North	8	9	0	.471	3–3	5–7	.507	.408	L1
10	Miami Dolphins	East	7	10	0	.412	3–3	3–9	.488	.378	L1
11 (Note: Cincinnati finished ahead of Kansas City based on conference record (Cincinnati 5–7 to Kansas City 3–9).)	Cincinnati Bengals	North	6	11	0	.353	3–3	5–7	.521	.451	L1
12	Kansas City Chiefs	West	6	11	0	.353	1–5	3–9	.514	.363	L6
13	Cleveland Browns	North	5	12	0	.294	2–4	4–8	.486	.418	W2
14 (Note: Las Vegas finished ahead of NY Jets and Tennessee based on conference record (Las Vegas 3–9 to NY Jets 2–10 and Tennessee 2–10).)	Las Vegas Raiders	West	3	14	0	.176	1–5	3–9	.538	.451	W1
15 (Note: NY Jets finished ahead of Tennessee based on strength of victory (NY Jets .373 to Tennessee .275).)	New York Jets	East	3	14	0	.176	0–6	2–10	.552	.373	L5
16	Tennessee Titans	South	3	14	0	.176	0–6	2–10	.574	.275	L2
**Tiebreakers** (Note: When breaking ties for three or more teams under the NFL's rules, they are first broken within divisions, then comparing only the highest ranked remaining team from each division.)

== Individual awards ==
=== Regular season ===
Recipient	Award(s)
Derrick Henry	Week 1: FedEx Ground Player of the Week Week 16 AFC Offensive Player of the Week
Roquan Smith	Week 2: AFC Defensive Player of the Week
Teddye Buchanan	October Rookie of the Month
Lamar Jackson	Week 9: AFC Offensive Player of the Week
Alohi Gilman	Week 15: AFC Defensive Player of the Week
