= Alohi Gilman =

American football player (born 1997)

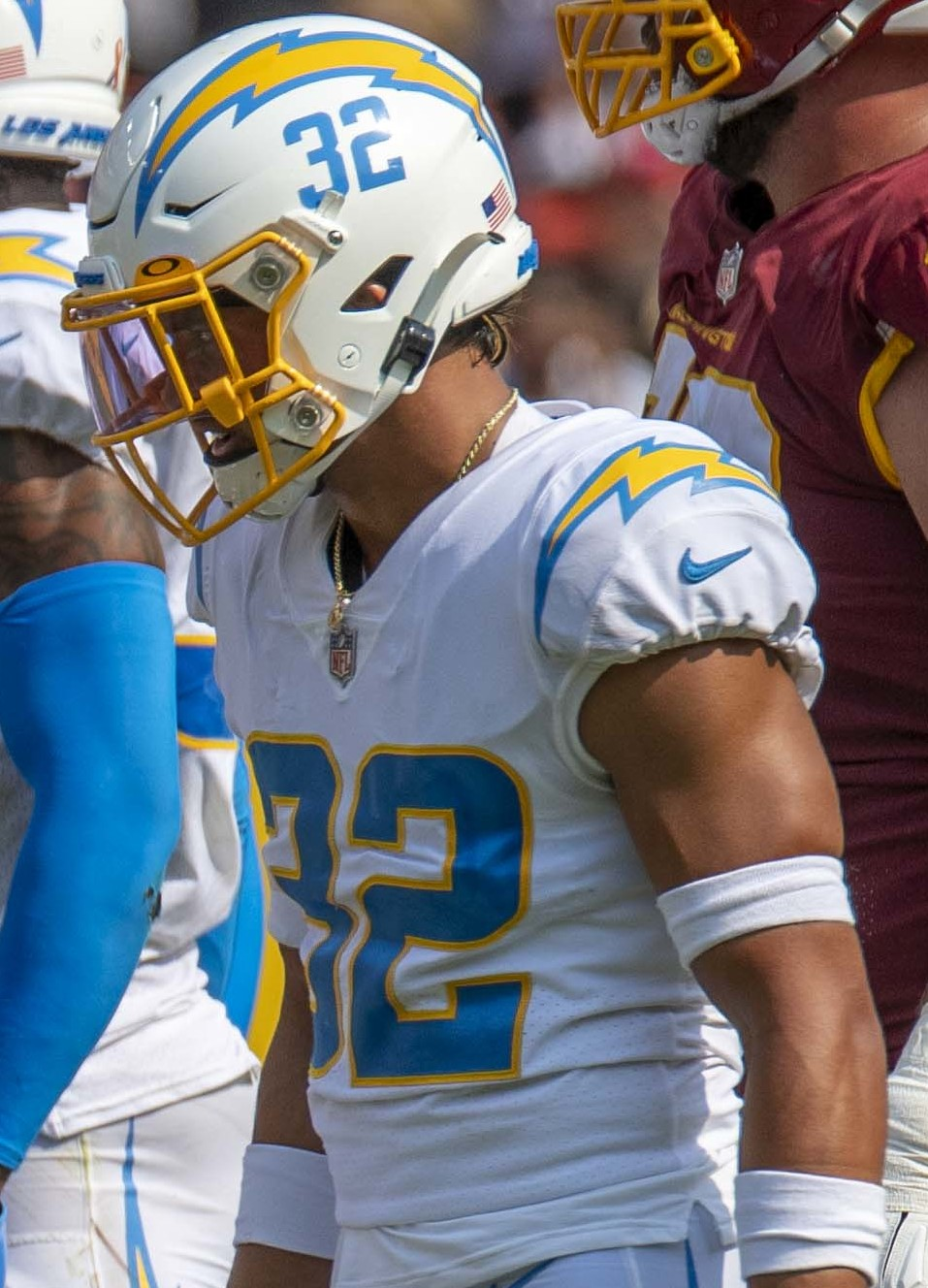
- Gilman with the Los Angeles Chargers in 2021

No. 17 – Kansas City Chiefs
- Position: Safety
- Roster status: Active

Personal information
- Born: September 17, 1997 (age 29); Laie, Hawaii, U.S.
- Listed height: 5 ft 10 in (1.78 m)
- Listed weight: 201 lb (91 kg)

Career information
- High school: Kahuku (Kahuku, Hawaii)
- College: Navy (2016); Notre Dame (2017–2019)
- NFL draft: 2020: 6th round, 186th overall pick

Career history
- Los Angeles Chargers (2020–2025); Baltimore Ravens (2025); Kansas City Chiefs (2026–present)

Career NFL statistics as of Week 4, 2026
- Total tackles: 337
- Sacks: 1.0
- Forced fumbles: 5
- Fumble recoveries: 6
- Pass deflections: 28
- Interceptions: 5
- Defensive touchdowns: 1
- Stats at Pro Football Reference

Asai Alohilaniokala "Alohi" Gilman (born September 17, 1997) is an American professional football safety for the Kansas City Chiefs of the National Football League (NFL). He played college football for the Notre Dame Fighting Irish and Navy Midshipmen and was drafted by the Los Angeles Chargers in the sixth round of the 2020 NFL draft.

== College career ==
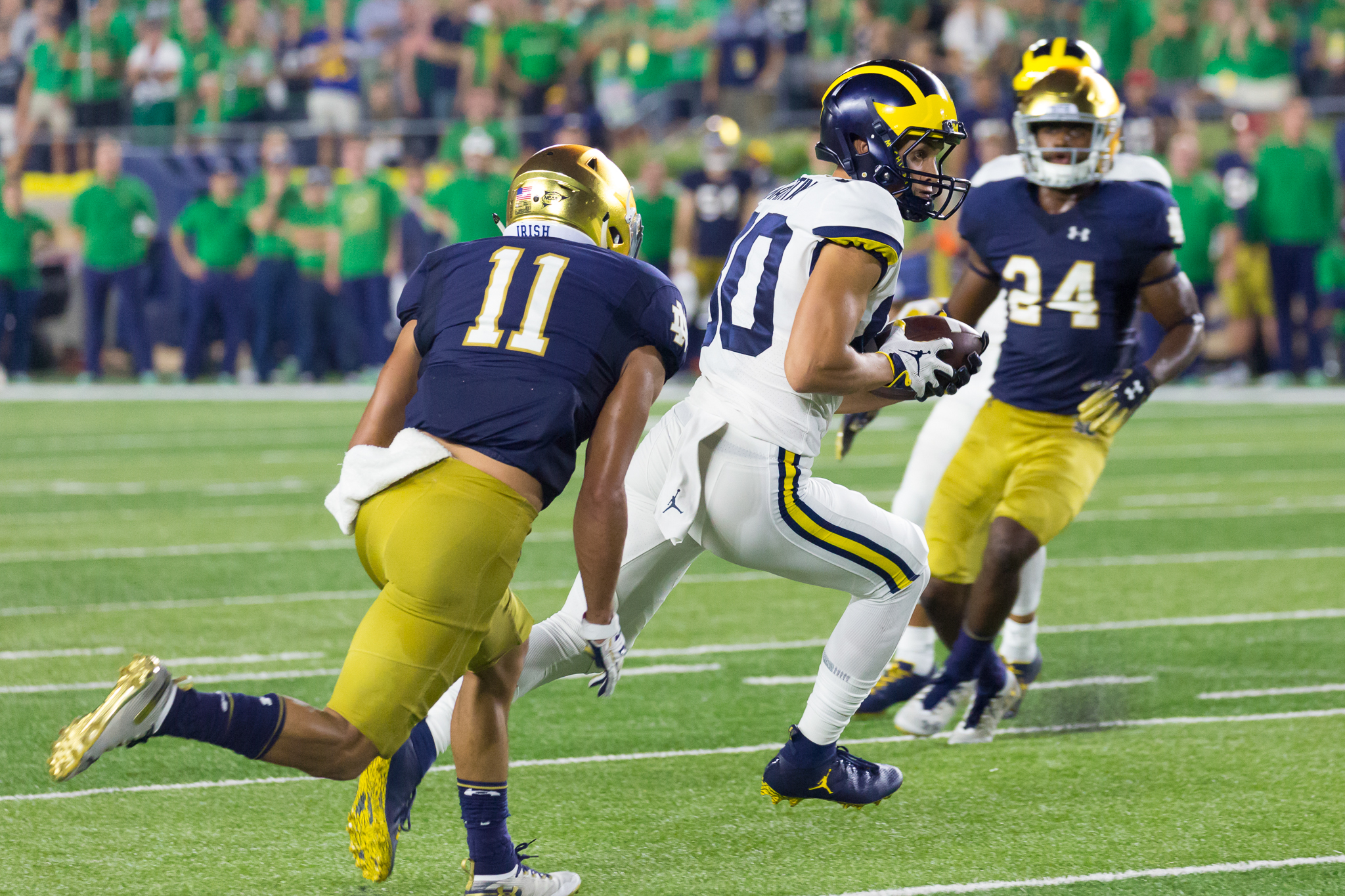
Gilman with Notre Dame in 2018

Gilman played his freshman year at the United States Naval Academy. He played in all 14 of the Midshipmen's games and was named honorable mention All-American Athletic Conference after finishing second on the team with 76 tackles along with five passes defended and two fumble recoveries. Gilman transferred to Notre Dame after his freshman year.

Gilman sat out his sophomore year per National Collegiate Athletic Association (NCAA) transfer rules. As a junior he started 13 games and finished the season with 95 tackles, three tackles for loss, and three forced fumbles, with two interceptions with five passes broken up. He was named a team captain as a senior and recorded 74 tackles, three tackles for loss and one sack with one interception, two passes broken up, one fumble recovery and three forced fumbles. After the end of season, Gilman announced that he would forgo his final year of NCAA eligibility to enter the 2020 NFL draft.

== Professional career ==
=== Pre-draft ===
He accepted an invitation to participate in the 2020 Senior Bowl and performed well until a hamstring injury rendered him unable to play. Prior to the NFL Combine, Michael Renner of Pro Football Focus had Gilman ranked as the ninth best safety in the draft. He attended the NFL Scouting Combine and completed all of the combined drills and exercises. Kevin Hanson of Sports Illustrated had Gilman ranked as the 11th best safety prospect in the draft. Scouts Inc. listed Gilman as the 11th best safety prospect (142nd overall) on their big board. NFL media analyst Daniel Jeremiah had him ranked 13th among all safety prospects (143rd overall) available in the draft. Josh Keatley of USA TODAY Sports ranked him as the 19th best safety prospect. NFL draft analysts varied on Gilman's draft projections with some projecting him to possibly go as early as the third round with most projecting a fifth or sixth round selection.

External videos
- Alohi Gilman's Notre Dame Highlights

Pre-draft measurables
Height	Weight	Arm length	Hand span	Wingspan	40-yard dash	10-yard split	20-yard split	20-yard shuttle	Three-cone drill	Vertical jump	Broad jump	Bench press
5 ft 10 1/2 in (1.79 m)	201 lb (91 kg)	30 7/8 in (0.78 m)	9 1/4 in (0.23 m)	6 ft 2 in (1.88 m)	4.60 s	1.59 s	2.77 s	4.08 s	6.81 s	32.0 in (0.81 m)	9 ft 11 in (3.02 m)	17 reps
All values from NFL Combine

=== Los Angeles Chargers ===
==== 2020 ====
The Los Angeles Chargers selected Gilman in the sixth round (186th overall) of the 2020 NFL draft. Gilman was the 15th safety drafted in 2020. He was reunited with former Notre Dame teammate Drue Tranquill who suggested to Los Angeles Chargers staff to draft Gilman.

External videos
- Chargers select Alohi Gilman No. 186
- 2020 Draft Prospects: Alohi Gilman

On July 22, 2020, the Los Angeles Chargers signed Gilman to a four–year, $3.48 million rookie contract that included a signing bonus of $187,876.

He entered training camp as a backup and competed for a roster spot as a backup strong safety and special teams player against Roderic Teamer. Gilman secured his roster spot after Teamer was suspended for the first four games due to a substance policy violation. Head coach Anthony Lynn named him a backup and listed him as the second strong safety on the depth chart to begin the season, behind starting safeties Rayshawn Jenkins and Nasir Adderley and the primary backup Desmond King. On September 5, 2020, the Chargers placed their expected starting strong safety Derwin James on injured reserve due to a torn meniscus.

On September 13, 2020, Gilman made his professional regular season debut in the Los Angeles Chargers' season-opener at the Cincinnati Bengals, but was limited to special teams as they won 16–13. He was inactive as a healthy scratch during a 39–29 victory against the Jacksonville Jaguars in Week 7. On January 3, 2021, Gilman earned the first start of his career in place of Rayshawn Jenkins who was inactive due to an ankle injury. He set a season-high with three combined tackles (two solo) during a 38–21 victory at the Kansas City Chiefs. He played mainly on special teams as a rookie, but began appearing in defense for the last five games. He finished his rookie season with only seven combined tackles (five solo) in 15 games and one start.

==== 2021 ====
On January 4, 2021, the Los Angeles Chargers fired head coach Anthony Lynn after they finished the 2020 NFL season with a 7–9 record. On January 17, 2021, the Chargers hired Los Angeles Rams' defensive coordinator Brandon Staley as their new head coach. Throughout training camp, he competed for a roster spot as a backup safety and special teams player against Mark Webb under new defensive coordinator Renaldo Hill. He was named the primary backup safety to begin the season, behind starting duo Derwin James and Nasir Adderley.

On September 26, 2021, Gilman set a season-high with seven solo tackles, made one pass deflection, and led the Chargers to a 30–24 comeback victory at the Kansas City Chiefs by making his first career interception on a pass thrown by Patrick Mahomes to tight end Travis Kelce with 1:55 remaining in the fourth quarter as the game was tied 24–24. His interception led to the game-winning 59–yard drive ending with a four–yard touchdown pass from Justin Herbert to wide receiver Mike Williams to win 27–24. He was inactive for the Chargers' 27–24 victory at the Philadelphia Eagles in Week 9 due to an ankle injury. He was also sidelined for five consecutive games (Weeks 11–15) after injuring his quadriceps. He finished the 2021 NFL season with a total of 42 combined tackles (28 solo), one pass deflection, and one interception in 11 games and three starts. He received an overall grade of 58.8 from Pro Football Focus in 2021.

==== 2022 ====
Throughout training camp, he competed for a roster spot as a special teams player and to be the primary backup safety against JT Woods, Raheem Layne, Ben DeLuca, and Mark Webb. Head coach Brandon Staley named him the primary backup safety to begin the season, behind starters Derwin James and Nasir Adderley.

Before Week 5, head coach Brandon Staley named Gilman the starting safety in lieu of Nasir Adderley, who he chose to bench after a poor performance in Week 4 against the Houston Texans. On October 9, 2022, Gilman earned his first start of the season and had seven combined tackles (four solo), a pass deflection, and helped secure a 30–28 victory at the Cleveland Browns by intercepting a pass by Jacoby Brissett to wide receiver Amari Cooper with only 2:54 remaining in the game. In Week 12, he set a season-high with ten combined tackles (five solo) and broke up a pass during a 25–24 victory at the Arizona Cardinals. He finished the season with 58 combined tackles (35 solo), three pass deflections, one forced fumble, and one interception in 17 games and three starts. He received an overall grade of 54.3 from Pro Football Focus in 2022.

The Los Angeles Chargers finished the 2022 NFL season second in the AFC West with a 10–7 record. On January 14, 2023, Gilman started in the first playoff game of his career and had five combined tackles (two solo) and a pass deflection as the Chargers lost 30–31 at the Jacksonville Jaguars in the AFC Wild-Card Game.

==== 2023 ====
He entered training camp slated to be the starting free safety under new defensive coordinator Derrick Ansley. Head coach Brandon Staley named him a starting safety to begin the season and paired him with starting strong safety Derwin James.

On September 10, 2023, Gilman started in the Los Angeles Chargers' home-opener against the Miami Dolphins and set a career-high with 11 combined tackles (nine solo) during a 34–36 loss. He was inactive for three games (Weeks 4, 6–7) due to a heel injury. On December 15, 2023, the Chargers fired head coach Brandon Staley after falling to a 5–9 record and appointed outside of linebackers coach Giff Smith to interim head coach. In Week 16, he had three combined tackles (two solo), one pass deflection, and intercepted a pass by Josh Allen to wide receiver Stefon Diggs during a 22–24 loss against the Buffalo Bills. On January 7, 2024, Gilman made three combined tackles (one solo), tied his season-high with two pass deflections, and set a career-high with his second interception of the season on a pass by Blaine Gabbert to wide receiver Mecole Hardman during a 12–13 loss against the Kansas City Chiefs. He started 14 games while recording 73 combined tackles (49 solo), a career-high ten pass deflections, three forced fumbles, two fumble recoveries, and two interceptions. He received an overall grade of 86.1 from Pro Football Focus in 2023.

==== 2024 ====
On March 13, 2024, the Chargers signed Gilman to a two–year, $10.12 million contract extension that includes $5.62 million guaranteed upon signing and an initial signing bonus of $4.50 million.

He returned to training camp slated as the de facto starting free safety under new defensive coordinator Jesse Minter. Head coach Jim Harbaugh retained Gilman and Derwin James as the starting safeties to begin the season.

He was inactive for the Chargers' 26–3 victory at the Carolina Panthers in Week 2 due to a knee injury. On October 13, 2024, Gilman set a season-high with ten combined tackles (six solo), made one pass deflection, and had his first career sack on Bo Nix during a 23–16 victory at the Denver Broncos. In Week 9, he had five combined tackles (four solo), a pass deflection, and had his lone interception of the season on a pass by Jameis Winston to wide receiver Cedric Tillman as the Chargers won 27–10 at the Cleveland Browns. In Week 12, Gilman made one pass deflection before exiting in the second quarter of a 23–20 loss to the Baltimore Ravens due to a hamstring injury. On November 30, 2024, the Chargers officially placed him on injured reserve due to his hamstring injury. On January 4, 2025, the Chargers activated Gilman from injured reserve and added him back to their active roster after he was inactive for five games (Weeks 13–17). He finished the season with a total of 50 combined tackles (34 solo), four pass deflections, one sack, and one interception in 11 games and 11 starts. He received an overall grade of 55.3 from Pro Football Focus, which ranked 129th among 171 qualifying safeties in 2024.

==== 2025 ====
Gilman made five starts for the Chargers, recording three pass deflections and 22 combined tackles.

=== Baltimore Ravens ===
On October 7, 2025, Gilman and a 2026 fifth-round pick (No. 162: Chandler Rivers) were traded to the Baltimore Ravens in exchange for Odafe Oweh and a 2027 seventh-round pick. On December 14, Gilman scored his first NFL touchdown when teammate Kyle Van Noy picked off Cincinnati Bengals quarterback Joe Burrow, then handed Gilman the ball, who ran it back for an 84-yard score.

=== Kansas City Chiefs ===
On March 12, 2026, Gilman signed a three-year, $24.75 million contract with the Kansas City Chiefs.

== NFL career statistics ==
=== Regular season ===
Year	Team	Games		Tackling					Interceptions						Fumbles			
Year	Team	GP	GS	Cmb	Solo	Ast	Sck	TFL	PD	Int	Yds	Avg	Lng	TD	FF	FR	Yds	TD
2020	LAC	15	1	7	5	2	0.0	0	0	0	0	0.0	0	0	0	0	0	0
2021	LAC	11	3	42	28	14	0.0	0	1	1	0	0.0	0	0	0	0	0	0
2022	LAC	17	5	58	35	23	0.0	0	3	1	18	18.0	18	0	1	2	4	0
2023	LAC	14	14	73	49	24	0.0	2	10	2	0	0.0	0	0	3	2	52	0
2024	LAC	11	11	50	34	16	1.0	1	4	1	18	18.0	18	0	0	0	0	0
2025	LAC	5	5	22	11	11	0.0	0	3	0	0	0	0	0	0	0	0	0
2025	BAL	12	12	68	39	29	0.0	1	6	0	84	84.0	84	1	1	2	11	0
2026	KAN	4	4	17	7	10	0.0	0	1	0	0	0	0	0	0	0	0	0
Career		89	55	337	208	129	1.0	4	28	5	120	24.0	84	1	5	6	67	0

=== Postseason ===
Year	Team	Games		Tackling					Interceptions						Fumbles			
Year	Team	GP	GS	Cmb	Solo	Ast	Sck	TFL	PD	Int	Yds	Avg	Lng	TD	FF	FR	Yds	TD
2022	LAC	1	1	5	2	3	0.0	0	1	0	0	0.0	0	0	0	0	0	0
2024	LAC	1	1	10	4	6	0.0	0	1	0	0	0.0	0	0	1	0	0	0
Career		2	2	15	6	9	0.0	0	2	0	0	0.0	0	0	1	0	0	0

== Personal life ==
Gilman is a member of the Church of Jesus Christ of Latter-day Saints. His younger brother, Alaka'i Gilman, played safety for the Utah Utes and is now a pit crew member for Hendrick Motorsports.
