= Odafe Oweh =

American football player (born 1998)

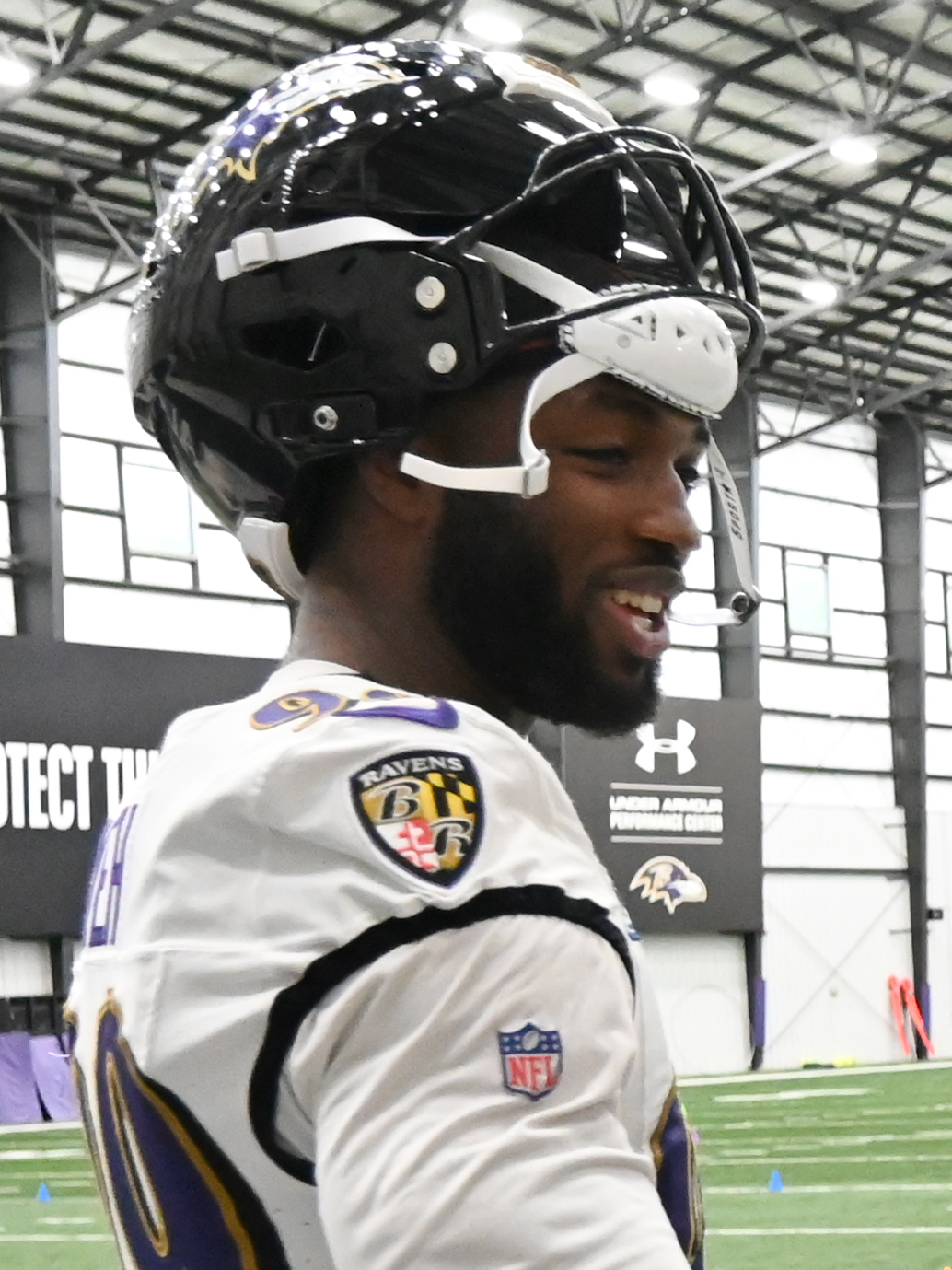
- Oweh with the Baltimore Ravens in 2024

No. 98 – Washington Commanders
- Position: Outside linebacker
- Roster status: Active

Personal information
- Born: December 15, 1998 (age 27); Hackensack, New Jersey, U.S.
- Listed height: 6 ft 5 in (1.96 m)
- Listed weight: 251 lb (114 kg)

Career information
- High school: Blair Academy (Blairstown, New Jersey)
- College: Penn State (2018–2020)
- NFL draft: 2021: 1st round, 31st overall pick

Career history
- Baltimore Ravens (2021–2025); Los Angeles Chargers (2025); Washington Commanders (2026–present)

Awards and highlights
- PFWA All-Rookie Team (2021); First-team All-Big Ten (2020)

Career NFL statistics as of Week 10, 2026
- Tackles: 196
- Sacks: 35.5
- Forced fumbles: 8
- Fumble recoveries: 4
- Pass deflections: 1
- Stats at Pro Football Reference

Odafe Jayson Oweh (/əˈdɑːfeɪ ˈoʊweɪ/; born December 15, 1998) is an American professional football outside linebacker for the Washington Commanders of the National Football League (NFL). Oweh played college football for the Penn State Nittany Lions and was selected by the Baltimore Ravens in the first round of the 2021 NFL draft. He has also played for the Los Angeles Chargers.

== Early life ==
Oweh, of Nigerian descent, was born on December 15, 1998, in Hackensack, New Jersey. He attended Blair Academy in Blairstown, New Jersey. While at Blair Academy, he became best friends with former teammate David Ojabo. He was selected to play in the 2018 Under Armour All-America Game. Oweh committed to Penn State to play college football.

== College career ==
As a true freshman at Penn State in 2018, Oweh played in four games and had two sacks. As a sophomore in 2019, he played in 13 games with one start and had 21 tackles and five sacks. He recorded 38 tackles, including seven tackles for a loss, in the 2020 season.

== Professional career ==
Pre-draft measurables
| Height | Weight | Arm length | Hand span | Wingspan | 40-yard dash | 10-yard split | 20-yard split | 20-yard shuttle | Three-cone drill | Vertical jump | Broad jump | Bench press |
|---|---|---|---|---|---|---|---|---|---|---|---|---|
| 6 ft 4 7/8 in (1.95 m) | 257 lb (117 kg) | 34 1/2 in (0.88 m) | 9 1/4 in (0.23 m) | 6 ft 10 in (2.08 m) | 4.37 s | 1.59 s | 2.59 s | 4.20 s | 6.90 s | 39.5 in (1.00 m) | 11 ft 2 in (3.40 m) | 21 reps |
All values from Pro Day

=== Baltimore Ravens ===
==== 2021 season ====
Oweh was selected by the Baltimore Ravens in the first round (31st overall) of the 2021 NFL draft, which they previously obtained in a trade that sent Orlando Brown Jr. to the Kansas City Chiefs. Soon after the draft, Oweh announced that he would be going by his first name Odafe instead of his middle name Jayson, which he went by in college to avoid confusion regarding the pronunciation of his first name. He signed his four-year rookie contract, worth $12.6 million, on June 10, 2021.

Oweh got his first career forced fumble and recovery late in the fourth quarter against Clyde Edwards-Helaire and the Chiefs, his second career game. The turnover helped seal a 36–35 victory. He was named the defensive player of the week for his performance, which included three tackles, a tackle for loss, a forced fumble, and a fumble recovery. He also had a quarterback hit on Patrick Mahomes that led to an interception by his teammate Tavon Young. He would not play the final two weeks of the season due to injury, becoming just one of the many Ravens players that would be injured that season. Oweh finished his rookie season with 33 total tackles, 5 sacks, 3 forced fumbles, 2 fumble recoveries, and a pass breakup. He was named to the PFWA All-Rookie Team.

==== 2022 season ====
In Week 4 against the Buffalo Bills, he forced a fumble that was recovered by teammate Marcus Williams and also had a sack on Josh Allen. However, the Ravens would lose 20–23. He finished the season with 43 tackles, three sacks, one forced fumble and a recovery in 17 games and six starts.

==== 2023 season ====
In 13 games and five starts in 2023, Oweh finished fourth on the team with five sacks, along with 23 tackles and two forced fumbles.

==== 2024 season ====
On April 30, 2024, the Ravens picked up the fifth-year option on Oweh's contract. He made 17 appearances (10 starts) for Baltimore, compiling one forced fumble, 10 sacks, and 39 combined tackles.

==== 2025 season ====
Oweh made five appearances (two starts) during the 2025 season, recording 10 combined tackles.

=== Los Angeles Chargers ===
On October 7, 2025, Oweh and a 2027 seventh-round pick were traded to the Los Angeles Chargers in exchange for Alohi Gilman and a 2026 fifth-round pick (No. 162: Chandler Rivers).

=== Washington Commanders ===
On March 14, 2026, Oweh signed with the Washington Commanders on a four-year, $100 million contract with $68 million guaranteed.

== Career statistics ==
=== NFL ===
Legend
| **Bold** | Career high |

==== Regular season ====
| Year | Team | Games | | Tackles | | | | | Fumbles | | | | Interceptions | | | | | |
| Year | Team | GP | GS | Cmb | Solo | Ast | Sck | TFL | FF | FR | Yds | TD | Int | Yds | Avg | Lng | TD | PD |
|---|---|---|---|---|---|---|---|---|---|---|---|---|---|---|---|---|---|---|
| 2021 | BAL | 15 | 2 | 33 | 23 | 10 | 5 | 5 | **3** | **2** | 0 | 0 | 0 | 0 | 0 | 0 | 0 | **1** |
| 2022 | BAL | 17 | 6 | **43** | **30** | **13** | 3 | 7 | 1 | 1 | 0 | 0 | 0 | 0 | 0 | 0 | 0 | 0 |
| 2023 | BAL | 13 | 5 | 23 | 20 | 3 | 5 | 4 | 2 | 0 | 0 | 0 | 0 | 0 | 0 | 0 | 0 | 0 |
| 2024 | BAL | 17 | 10 | 39 | 25 | 14 | **10** | **9** | 1 | 0 | 0 | 0 | 0 | 0 | 0 | 0 | 0 | 0 |
| 2025 | BAL | 5 | 2 | 10 | 5 | 5 | 0 | 1 | 0 | 0 | 0 | 0 | 0 | 0 | 0 | 0 | 0 | 0 |
| 2025 | LAC | 12 | 2 | 28 | 15 | 13 | 7.5 | 8 | 0 | 0 | 0 | 0 | 0 | 0 | 0 | 0 | 0 | 0 |
| 2026 | WAS | 9 | 9 | 20 | 11 | 9 | 5.0 | 6 | 1 | 1 | 0 | 0 | 0 | 0 | 0 | 0 | 0 | 0 |
| Career | | 88 | 36 | 196 | 129 | 67 | 35.5 | 40 | 8 | 4 | 0 | 0 | 0 | 0 | 0 | 0 | 0 | 1 |

==== Postseason ====
| Year | Team | Games | | Tackles | | | | | Fumbles | | | |
| Year | Team | GP | GS | Cmb | Solo | Ast | Sck | TFL | FF | FR | Yds | TD |
|---|---|---|---|---|---|---|---|---|---|---|---|---|
| 2022 | BAL | 1 | 0 | 2 | 2 | 0 | 1 | 1 | 0 | 0 | 0 | 0 |
| 2023 | BAL | **2** | 0 | 2 | 0 | **2** | 0 | 0 | 0 | 0 | 0 | 0 |
| 2024 | BAL | **2** | 0 | 3 | 3 | 0 | 1 | 1 | 0 | 0 | 0 | 0 |
| 2025 | LAC | 1 | 0 | **4** | **4** | 0 | **3** | **3** | **2** | 0 | 0 | 0 |
| Career | | 6 | 0 | 11 | 9 | 2 | 5 | 5 | 2 | 0 | 0 | 0 |

=== College ===
College statistics
| Season | GP | Tackles | | | | | Fumbles | | | | Interceptions | | | |
| Season | GP | Solo | Ast | Comb | TFL | Sck | FF | FR | Yds | TD | Int | Yds | TD | PD |
|---|---|---|---|---|---|---|---|---|---|---|---|---|---|---|
| 2018 | 4 | 4 | 0 | 4 | 2 | 2.0 | 0 | 0 | 0 | 0 | 0 | 0 | 0 | 0 |
| 2019 | **13** | 13 | 8 | 21 | 5 | **5.0** | **2** | 0 | 0 | 0 | 0 | 0 | 0 | **1** |
| 2020 | 7 | **20** | **18** | **38** | **7** | 0.0 | 0 | 0 | 0 | 0 | 0 | 0 | 0 | **1** |
| Career | 24 | 37 | 26 | 63 | 14 | 7.0 | 2 | 0 | 0 | 0 | 0 | 0 | 0 | 2 |

== Personal life ==
Oweh's younger brother, Otega Oweh, played college basketball for the Kentucky Wildcats. He was later selected with the 41st overall pick in the 2026 NBA draft and was a guard for the Oklahoma City Thunder of the National Basketball Association before he was waived on October 25, 2026.
