= Kyle Van Noy =

American football player (born 1991)

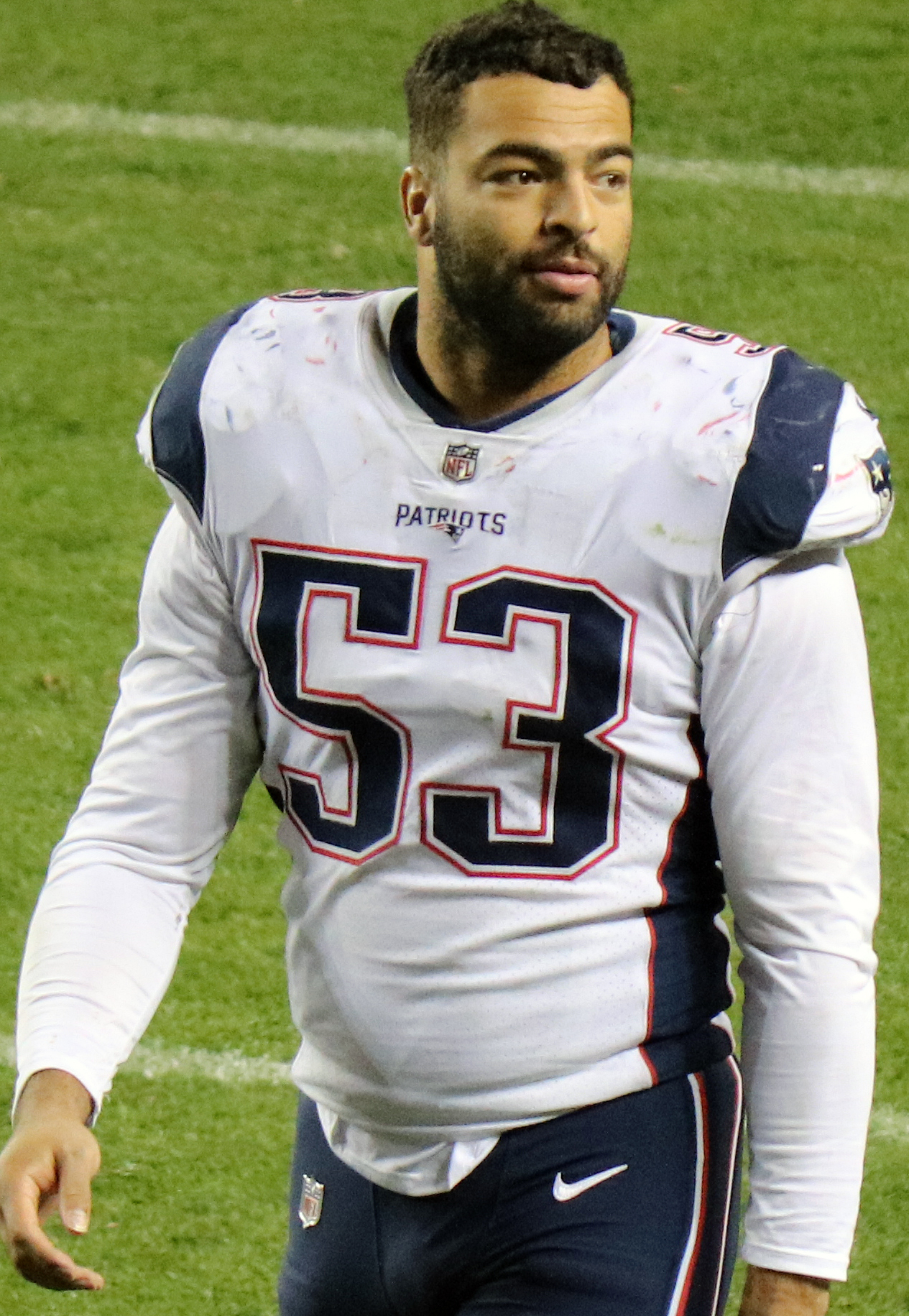
- Van Noy with the New England Patriots in 2017

No. 17 – Minnesota Vikings
- Position: Outside linebacker
- Roster status: Active

Personal information
- Born: March 26, 1991 (age 35); Reno, Nevada, U.S.
- Listed height: 6 ft 3 in (1.91 m)
- Listed weight: 255 lb (116 kg)

Career information
- High school: Robert McQueen (Reno)
- College: BYU (2009–2013)
- NFL draft: 2014: 2nd round, 40th overall pick

Career history
- Detroit Lions (2014–2016); New England Patriots (2016–2019); Miami Dolphins (2020); New England Patriots (2021); Los Angeles Chargers (2022); Baltimore Ravens (2023–2025); Minnesota Vikings (2026–present)

Awards and highlights
- 2× Super Bowl champion (LI, LIII); Pro Bowl (2024); New England Patriots All-2010s Team; 3× First-team All-Independent (2011–2013)

Career NFL statistics as of Week 10, 2026
- Total tackles: 577
- Sacks: 59.5
- Forced fumbles: 14
- Fumble recoveries: 10
- Pass deflections: 39
- Interceptions: 4
- Total touchdowns: 4
- Stats at Pro Football Reference

Kyle Van Noy (born March 26, 1991) is an American professional football outside linebacker for the Minnesota Vikings of the National Football League (NFL). He played college football for the BYU Cougars, where he graduated with a degree in history in 2013. He was selected in the second round of the 2014 NFL draft by the Detroit Lions and has played for five NFL teams over 12 seasons, including the New England Patriots, where he won Super Bowl LI and Super Bowl LIII. Van Noy recorded a career-high 12.5 sacks with the Ravens in 2024 and was selected to his first Pro Bowl at age 33. He was named a finalist for the Art Rooney Sportsmanship Award in consecutive seasons (2024, 2025).

== Early life ==
Van Noy was born in Reno, Nevada in 1991. His birth mother placed him for adoption as a newborn through LDS Family Services; she was not a member of the Church of Jesus Christ of Latter-day Saints but requested that he be raised in an LDS household. He was adopted at approximately three to four months of age by Layne and Kelly Van Noy, who were then living in Lodi, California. The Van Noys also had an older son, Travis.

The adoption was a closed arrangement, and Van Noy has not met his biological parents. He has said that his parents were straightforward about his adoption from an early age. In a 2017 interview with Patriots.com, he recalled: “It wasn’t that big of a deal. No one acted weird or different about it. You just kind of rolled with it.” His adoptive mother, Kelly Van Noy, told the Deseret News that the family chose to be open with Kyle about his origins from the start, saying, “We didn’t think there was a magical time that he was told. We’ve always explained who he was and that we love him.”

The family moved to Reno, Nevada when Van Noy was approximately 11 years old. His father, Layne, managed the city’s recreation programs and guided Kyle’s early athletic development. Van Noy attended McQueen High School in Reno where, as an all-state linebacker and receiver, he led his high school football team to a perfect 14–0 record and a 4A state championship in 2008, and was rated as a 4-star recruit by Rivals.com and Scout.com.

In addition to playing football, Van Noy lettered in basketball, baseball, and track where he was an all-league performer (4 × 100 m, 4 × 200 m and 4 × 400 m). He also ran the 100 meters in 11.84 seconds and the 400 meters in 50.99 seconds.

Van Noy was ranked the 63rd best high school athlete by ESPN. He received scholarship offers from Arizona, Arizona State University, Boise State University, BYU, California, University of Colorado, UCLA, UNLV, Nevada, San Jose State University, and Stanford.

== College career ==
=== Freshman season ===
Van Noy was admitted to Brigham Young University. During the 2010 season, he played in every game while starting two and earned letterman honors. He recorded 35 tackles (24 solo) and was third on the team with 7.5 tackles-for-loss including 2.0 sacks. He also recorded two forced fumbles, two quarterback hurries, two pass breakups and one fumble recovery (which he returned 44 yards for a touchdown).

=== Sophomore season ===
Van Noy played in all 13 games, starting in 8, of the 2011 season, recording 68 tackles and leading the team with 15 tackles for loss, 7 sacks, 10 quarterback hurries and tied for the team-lead with three interceptions. During the 2011 season, Van Noy was the only FBS Division I player to record a stat in each of the following categories: tackle, tackle for loss, sack, interception, pass breakup, quarterback hurry, fumble recovery, forced fumble, blocked kick and touchdown. As he did in the 2010 season, he again recovered a fumble (which he forced), which he returned for the game-winning touchdown.

He was named to the Phil Steele All-Independent First-team, Yahoo! Sports All-Independent Team and FBS All-Independent Team.

=== Junior season ===
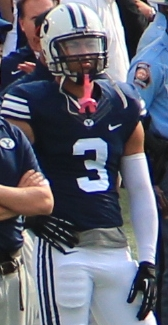
Van Noy with BYU in 2012

In 2012, Van Noy was the defensive leader of a BYU team that led the nation in red zone defense (opponent red zone percentage of .62), was second in rushing defense (84.25 yards/game), third in 3rd down conversion percentage (27.71%), fourth in 1st down defense (14.83/game), and fifth in scoring defense (176 total points). Additionally, they were in the top 25 in passing defense (13th), sacks (22nd), 4th down conversion defense (23rd), and tackles for loss (25th).

In 13 games played, he recorded 53 tackles, 22 tackles-for-loss, 13.0 sacks, 2 interceptions (one for a touchdown), 6 forced fumbles with 1 fumble recovered (for a touchdown), 8 quarterback hurries, 5 pass break-ups, and 2 blocked kicks. Van Noy dominated in BYU's 23–6 victory over San Diego State in the 2012 Poinsettia Bowl, where he recorded 8 tackles, 1.5 sacks, 1 forced fumble, 1 fumble recovery (for a touchdown), 1 interception (for a touchdown), and a blocked punt.

Van Noy was named to the Bronko Nagurski Trophy, Lombardi Award and Chuck Bednarik Award Watch Lists, was National Linebacker of Week 3, and was third team All-American.

Van Noy was projected as a first or second round pick in the 2013 NFL draft, but opted to remain at BYU for his senior season.

=== Senior season ===
As a senior in 2013, Van Noy was named to the watch lists for the Butkus Award, Lombardi Award, Bronko Nagurski Trophy, Walter Camp, Chuck Bednarik Award, and the Lott Trophy. He was a Phil Steele, USA Today, and Sports Illustrated Preseason All-American and finished the season All-America to Walter Camp Second-team, Athlon Sports Third-team, CBSSports.com Third-team and Sport and SI.com Honorable Mention. He was also named to the All-Independent first-team and was the All-Independent Defensive Player of the Year. In his final collegiate season, he recorded 70 total tackles, 17 tackles-for-loss, 4.0 sacks, two interceptions, six passes defended, and two fumble recoveries.

== Professional career ==
=== Pre-draft ===
On December 16, 2013, it was announced that Van Noy had accepted his invitation to the Senior Bowl. On January 25, 2014, Van Noy played in the 2014 Senior Bowl and recorded two solo tackles and one sack as part of Jacksonville Jaguars' head coach Gus Bradley's South team that defeated the North 20–10. His Senior Bowl performance helped solidify his status as a top outside linebacker in the draft. He was also ranked as the top outside linebacker in the Senior Bowl by the Reese's Senior Bowl Executive Director Phil Savage. Van Noy attended the NFL Scouting Combine in Indianapolis and completed all of the combine drills.

External videos
- Kyle Van Noy's NFL Combine Workout

On March 14, Van Noy participated at BYU's pro day, but chose to stand on his combine numbers and only performed positional drills. He attended pre-draft visits with multiple teams, including the Atlanta Falcons, the Baltimore Ravens, the Detroit Lions, and the Jaguars. At the conclusion of the pre-draft process, Van Noy was projected to be a second round pick by NFL draft experts and scouts. He was ranked as the fourth-best outside linebacker prospect in the draft by CBS Sports, and was ranked as the fifth-best outside linebacker by DraftScout.com and NFL analyst Mike Mayock. Van Noy was also ranked as the fifth-best linebacker by Sports Illustrated.

Pre-draft measurables
Height	Weight	Arm length	Hand span	Wingspan	40-yard dash	10-yard split	20-yard split	20-yard shuttle	Three-cone drill	Vertical jump	Broad jump	Bench press
6 ft 3 1/8 in (1.91 m)	243 lb (110 kg)	31 5/8 in (0.80 m)	9 5/8 in (0.24 m)	6 ft 5 7/8 in (1.98 m)	4.71 s	1.62 s	2.72 s	4.20 s	7.22 s	32.5 in (0.83 m)	9 ft 4 in (2.84 m)	21 reps
All values from NFL Combine

=== Detroit Lions ===
==== 2014 ====
The Lions selected Van Noy in the second round (40th overall) of the 2014 NFL draft. Detroit traded their second (No. 45: Paul Richardson), fourth (No. 111: the Cincinnati Bengals selected Russell Bodine), and seventh round (No. 227: Kiero Small) picks to the Seattle Seahawks in exchange for a fifth round pick (No. 146: the Dallas Cowboys selected Devin Street), as well as the pick that was used to draft Van Noy. He was the sixth linebacker selected in the draft. On June 4, 2014, the Lions signed Van Noy to a four-year, $5.10 million rookie contract, with $2.63 million guaranteed and a $2.03 million signing bonus.

External videos
- Lions draft Kyle Van Noy 40th overall
- 2014 NFL Draft Profile: Kyle Van Noy

Throughout training camp, Van Noy competed against Ashlee Palmer to be the starting strongside linebacker. On August 25, it was reported that the former had noticed an abdominal injury five days prior and would miss the next four-to-six weeks. On August 28, the Lions announced that Van Noy had successfully undergone muscle core surgery, but offered no timetable on his return.

In Week 10, Van Noy made his professional regular season debut and registered two solo tackles during a 20–16 victory against the Miami Dolphins. Van Noy completed his rookie season with six solo tackles while appearing in eight games with zero starts. The Lions finished second in the NFC North with an 11–5 record and earned a wild card playoff berth. On January 4, 2015, Van Noy appeared in his first career playoff game as the Lions lost 24–20 at the Dallas Cowboys during the NFC Wildcard Game.

==== 2015 ====
During training camp, Van Noy competed against Tahir Whitehead to be the starting strongside linebacker. To start the season, head coach Jim Caldwell named the former the backup strongside linebacker, behind Tahir Whitehead. Van Noy was inactive as a healthy scratch for the Lions' Week 5 loss to the Arizona Cardinals due to the return of DeAndre Levy. On October 25, 2015, Van Noy recorded two solo tackles and made his first career sack during the Lions' 28–19 loss to the Minnesota Vikings in Week 7. He sacked Vikings' quarterback Teddy Bridgewater for a one-yard loss during the first quarter. In Week 12, he collected a season-high three solo tackles during a 45–14 win against the Philadelphia Eagles. He finished the 2015 NFL season with ten combined tackles (eight solo) and one sack in 16 games with one start.

==== 2016 ====
Throughout training camp, Van Noy competed against Jon Bostic and Josh Bynes for the job of starting linebacker. Caldwell named the former to be starting strongside linebacker to begin the regular season, alongside DeAndre Levy and middle linebacker Tahir Whitehead.

He made his first career start in the Lions' season-opener at the Indianapolis Colts and deflected one pass during their 39–35 victory. In Week 4, he collected a season-high seven solo tackles during a 17–14 loss at the Chicago Bears. Before being traded, Van Noy started the first seven games of the season for the Lions and registered 23 total tackles. He finished his stint as a Lion with a total of 39 tackles.

=== New England Patriots (first stint) ===
==== 2016 ====
On October 25, 2016, the Lions traded Van Noy and a seventh round pick (239th overall) in the 2017 NFL draft to the New England Patriots in exchange for a sixth round pick (215th overall) in 2017. Van Noy later said the trade was a turning point in his career. Keith Nellesen, a close friend, told the Deseret News that Van Noy “was a different person once he got to New England” and that he “thrives on acceptance and stability.” Van Noy was inactive for his first two games with the Patriots (Weeks 8 and 10), and served as the backup weakside linebacker behind Shea McClellin.

On November 20, Van Noy played in his first game as a Patriot and recorded three combined tackles and one sack during their 30–17 win at the San Francisco 49ers in Week 11. On December 4, he recorded five combined tackles, broke up a pass, and made his first career interception during a 26–10 win against the Los Angeles Rams. Van Noy intercepted a pass by Rams' rookie quarterback Jared Goff during the third quarter after the play was disrupted by Jabaal Sheard. He appeared in seven games for the Patriots that season and recorded 29 combined tackles (11 solo), two pass deflections, one sack, and one interception. As both a Lion and Patriot in total, Van Noy finished the season with 52 combined tackles (32 solo), three pass deflections, one sack, and one interception in 14 games with nine starts.

External videos
- Van Noy intercepts a pass by Jared Goff

The Patriots finished first in the AFC East with a 14–2 record and earned a first round bye in the playoffs. The Patriots defeated the Houston Texans 34–16 in the AFC Divisional Round. On January 22, 2017, Van Noy recorded four solo tackles during a 36–17 win against the Pittsburgh Steelers in the AFC Championship Game. On February 5, he appeared in Super Bowl LI and made one tackle and was credited with half a sack during the Patriots' 34–28 overtime victory against the Falcons. The Patriots came back from a 25-point deficit in the third quarter to defeat the Falcons to earn Van Noy the first Super Bowl victory of his career.

==== 2017 ====
During training camp, Van Noy competed to be a starting outside linebacker against David Harris, Elandon Roberts, and Shea McClellin. The former was named the starting strongside linebacker to begin the regular season. He started alongside Elandon Roberts and middle linebacker Dont'a Hightower. On September 8, 2017, the Patriots signed Van Noy to a two-year, $11.75 million contract that includes $5.50 million guaranteed and a signing bonus of $3.50 million.

External videos
- Van Noy shuts down Taylor Gabriel on 4th down
- Van Noy sacks Tyrod Taylor for massive loss

In Week 3, he collected a season-high 11 combined tackles (nine solo) during a 36–33 win against the Texans. On October 15, Van Noy recorded seven combined tackles and made a season-high two sacks during a 24–17 victory at the New York Jets in Week 7. He sustained a calf injury and was inactive for three games (Weeks 14–16). Van Noy finished the 2017 NFL season with 73 combined tackles (58 solo), 5.5 sacks, and two pass deflections in 13 games with 12 starts.

For the second consecutive year, the Patriots finished atop their division (with a 13–3 record) and earned a first round bye in the playoffs. They defeated the Tennessee Titans 35–14 in the AFC Divisional Round. On January 21, 2018, Van Noy made nine combined tackles, a pass deflection, and one sack as the Patriots defeated the Jaguars 24–20 in the AFC Championship Game. On February 4, Van Noy started in Super Bowl LII and made five combined tackles as the Patriots lost 41–33 to the Philadelphia Eagles.

==== 2018 ====
Then-linebackers coach Brian Flores took over duties as defensive coordinator after Matt Patricia accepted the head coaching position for the Lions. He named Van Noy and Dont'a Hightower the starting linebackers to begin the regular season as the Patriots continued to use a base defense that deployed only two linebackers.

On October 21, 2018, Van Noy registered six solo tackles and scored his first career touchdown after returning a blocked punt during the Patriots 38–31 victory at the Bears in Week 7. During the third quarter, he recovered a punt attempt by Bears' punter Pat O'Donnell that was blocked by Hightower and returned it 29 yards for a touchdown. In Week 10, he collected a season-high 12 combined tackles (five solo) during the Patriots' 34–10 loss at the Titans. Against the New York Jets on December 30, Van Noy scored his second career touchdown after recovering a fumble forced by teammate Adam Butler. On January 13, 2019, the Patriots defeated the Chargers in the AFC Divisional Round of the playoffs to move on to the AFC Championship Game. Van Noy recorded 4 tackles in the win. On January 20, the Patriots defeated the Kansas City Chiefs in the AFC Championship Game in overtime. In the game, he recorded ten tackles, two sacks, and a forced fumble. The win advanced the Patriots to their third straight Super Bowl. In Super Bowl LIII, Van Noy recorded 3 tackles, a sack, and a tackle for loss in the Patriots' 13–3 victory over the Rams. The three points allowed by the Patriots' defense were tied for the fewest ever in a Super Bowl.

==== 2019 ====
In Week 4 against the Buffalo Bills, Van Noy recorded a team-high 8 tackles, 2 sacks on Josh Allen, and forced 2 fumbles in the 16–10 win. He was named AFC Defensive Player of the Week for his efforts. In Week 6 against the New York Giants, Van Noy recorded a sack on rookie quarterback Daniel Jones and recovered a fumble forced by teammate Jamie Collins on Giants' running back Jon Hilliman, returning the ball for a 20-yard touchdown in the 35–14 win. In Week 7 against the Jets, Van Noy recovered a fumble by quarterback Sam Darnold forced by teammate John Simon in the 33–0 win. In Week 9 against the Ravens, Van Noy forced a fumble on running back Mark Ingram II that was recovered by teammate Lawrence Guy in the 37–20 loss. He finished the season with 6.5 sacks, 56 total tackles, three passes defended, and two forced fumbles in 15 games with as many starts.

=== Miami Dolphins ===
On March 21, 2020, the Dolphins signed Van Noy to a four-year, $51 million contract that included $30 million guaranteed and a signing bonus of $12 million. The signing reunited Van Noy with Dolphins' head coach Brian Flores, former linebackers coach for New England from 2016 to 2018. He was also reunited with former Patriots' linebackers Kamu Grugier-Hill and Elandon Roberts.

Van Noy made his debut with the Dolphins in Week 1 against his former team, the Patriots. During the game, Van Noy sacked quarterback Cam Newton once in the 21–11 loss. In Week 3 against the Jaguars on Thursday Night Football, Van Noy recorded a strip sack and later recovered the football during the 31–13 win. In Week 13, Van Noy recorded eight tackles, five for loss, and three sacks in a 19–7 win over the Cincinnati Bengals. His efforts earned him AFC Defensive Player of the Week honors. He was placed on the reserve/COVID-19 list by the team on November 12, 2020, and was activated two days later. Van Noy finished the season with six sacks, 69 total tackles, six passes defended, and two forced fumbles in 14 appearances with 13 starts.

Van Noy was released by the Dolphins after one season on March 10, 2021.

=== New England Patriots (second stint) ===
On March 19, 2021, the Patriots signed Van Noy to a two-year deal worth up to $13.2 million. In the 2021 season, he appeared in 16 games with eight starts, recording five sacks, 66 total tackles, one interception, ten passes defended, and two forced fumbles. While he was productive in his second stint in New England, the Patriots were tight on cap space. Van Noy was released on March 7, 2022.

=== Los Angeles Chargers ===
On May 5, 2022, Van Noy signed with the Los Angeles Chargers. He appeared in 17 games with 13 starts in the 2022 season, and recorded five sacks, 46 total tackles, three passes defended, and one forced fumble.

=== Baltimore Ravens ===
==== 2023 ====
Van Noy entered the 2023 season without a roster spot at age 32 after being released by the Chargers. After signing with the Ravens’ practice squad on September 27, 2023, and being promoted to the active roster three days later, he recorded a then career-high nine sacks in fourteen appearances, leading to a two-year, $10 million contract extension with Baltimore.

==== 2024 ====
On April 4, 2024, Van Noy signed a two-year, $10 million contract extension with the Ravens. In Week 1 against the Kansas City Chiefs, Van Noy would post just one solo tackle, before going down with an eye injury in the third quarter, which was later disclosed to be an orbital bone fracture. Van Noy did not provide a timetable for his injury, stating simply that it was "a pretty good fracture," and that he was still going through tests with specialists; he ultimately did not miss any time. He was also critical of the Chiefs medical staff saying that “they took an entire quarter to get down to talk to me in the locker room.” Subsequently, Van Noy recorded 2.0 sacks in each of the next three games, including a strip sack of Josh Allen in Week 4 against the Buffalo Bills with the resulting fumble recovered by Kyle Hamilton. Van Noy was named the AFC Defensive Player of the Month for the Month of September. Van Noy would then record at least 1.0 sack over his last five games of the season, and finished the season with a career-high 12.5 sacks in 16 games. He was selected to his first Pro Bowl after the season.

==== 2025 ====
Van Noy appeared in 15 games for the Ravens during the 2025 season, recording two sacks, 20 tackles, one interception, and four passes defended. He missed two games due to a hamstring injury sustained in the early weeks of the season. In Week 15 against the Cincinnati Bengals, Van Noy intercepted a pass by quarterback Joe Burrow and lateraled the ball to safety Alohi Gilman, who returned it 84 yards for a touchdown in a 24–0 shutout. Van Noy was named the Ravens’ nominee for the Art Rooney Sportsmanship Award for the second consecutive year and was selected as one of eight finalists for the award, which is voted on by NFL players.

=== Minnesota Vikings ===
On September 2, 2026, Van Noy was signed to the Minnesota Vikings' practice squad. On September 29, he was signed to the active roster, after the team activated him the three first weeks of the season. In week 10 against the Green Bay Packers, he sacked Jordan Love once in the 30–10 win.

== Career statistics ==
Legend
	Won the Super Bowl
	Led the league
**Bold**	Career high

=== NFL ===
==== Regular season ====
Year	Team	Games		Tackles					Interceptions						Fumbles			
Year	Team	GP	GS	Cmb	Solo	Ast	Sck	TFL	PD	Int	Yds	Avg	Lng	TD	FF	FR	Yds	TD
2014	DET	8	0	6	6	0	0.0	1	0	0	0	0.0	0	0	0	0	0	0
2015	DET	15	0	10	8	2	1.0	2	0	0	0	0.0	0	0	0	0	0	0
2016	DET	7	7	23	21	2	0.0	0	1	0	0	0.0	0	0	0	0	0	0
2016	NE	7	2	29	11	18	1.0	2	2	**1**	0	0.0	0	0	1	0	0	0
2017	NE	13	12	73	**58**	15	5.5	7	2	0	0	0.0	0	0	0	0	0	0
2018	NE	16	16	**92**	55	**37**	3.5	5	2	**1**	0	0.0	0	0	1	**2**	**46**	**1**
2019	NE	15	15	56	41	15	6.5	7	3	0	0	0.0	0	0	**3**	**2**	22	**1**
2020	MIA	14	13	69	46	23	6.0	10	6	0	0	0.0	0	0	2	**2**	28	0
2021	NE	16	8	66	42	24	5.0	5	**10**	**1**	**35**	**35.0**	**35**	**1**	2	1	0	0
2022	LAC	17	13	46	30	16	5.0	8	3	0	0	0.0	0	0	1	**2**	0	0
2023	BAL	14	3	30	20	10	9.0	9	4	0	0	0.0	0	0	2	0	0	0
2024	BAL	16	13	41	25	16	**12.5**	**14**	2	0	0	0.0	0	0	2	1	0	0
2025	BAL	15	13	20	12	8	2.0	4	4	**1**	11	11.0	11	0	0	0	0	0
2026	MIN	4	1	9	7	2	1.5	6	0	0	0	0.0	0	0	0	0	0	0
Career		177	116	570	382	188	58.5	80	39	4	46	11.5	35	1	14	10	96	2

==== Postseason ====
Year	Team	Games		Tackles					Interceptions						Fumbles			
Year	Team	GP	GS	Cmb	Solo	Ast	Sck	TFL	PD	Int	Yds	Avg	Lng	TD	FF	FR	Yds	TD
2014	DET	1	0	0	0	0	0.0	0	0	0	0	0.0	0	0	0	0	0	0
2016	NE	3	0	7	6	1	0.5	0	**1**	0	0	0.0	0	0	**1**	0	0	0
2017	NE	3	3	16	11	**5**	1.0	**2**	**1**	0	0	0.0	0	0	**1**	0	0	0
2018	NE	3	3	**18**	**16**	2	**3.0**	**2**	**1**	0	0	0.0	0	0	**1**	0	0	0
2019	NE	1	1	5	4	1	1.0	1	0	0	0	0.0	0	0	**1**	0	0	0
2021	NE	1	1	3	1	2	0.0	0	0	0	0	0.0	0	0	0	0	0	0
2022	LAC	1	0	3	2	1	0.0	0	**1**	0	0	0.0	0	0	0	0	0	0
2023	BAL	2	1	4	3	1	0.0	1	0	0	0	0.0	0	0	0	0	0	0
2024	BAL	2	2	4	2	2	0.5	0	0	0	0	0.0	0	0	0	0	0	0
Career		17	11	60	45	15	6.0	6	4	0	0	0.0	0	0	4	0	0	0

=== College ===
Season	Team	GP	Tackles					Sacks			Interceptions				Fumbles			
Season	Team	GP	Cmb	Solo	Ast	TfL	Yds	Sck	Yds	QBH	Int	Yds	TD	PD	FF	FR	Yds	TD
2010	BYU	13	35	24	11	7.5	38	2.0	19	2	0	0	0	2	2	1	**44**	**1**
2011	BYU	13	**68**	**50**	18	15.0	93	7.0	54	10	**3**	**79**	0	3	3	1	9	**1**
2012	BYU	13	53	37	16	**22.0**	**120**	**13.0**	**90**	8	2	26	**1**	0	**6**	1	0	0
2013	BYU	13	63	38	**25**	17.5	70	4.0	29	**12**	2	17	**1**	**6**	0	**2**	0	0
Career		52	219	149	70	62.0	321	26.0	192	32	7	122	2	11	11	5	53	2

== Career highlights ==
NFL

- 2× Super Bowl champion (LI, LIII)
- Pro Bowl (2024)
- New England Patriots All-2010s Team
- AFC Defensive Player of the Month (September 2024)
- 2× AFC Defensive Player of the Week (Week 13, 2020; Week 4, 2019)

College

- 3× First-team All-Independent (2011–2013)
- Independent Defensive Player of the Year by College Sports Madness/SB Nation, 2013

== Personal life ==
While attending Brigham Young University, Van Noy was roommates with and a mentor to Ezekiel "Ziggy" Ansah, who walked on to the BYU football team in 2010 as a statistics major from Ghana with no prior football experience. Van Noy taught Ansah fundamentals including tackling technique and training regimen. The two were later reunited as teammates on the Detroit Lions when Ansah was selected in the first round of the 2013 NFL draft. Van Noy was also close friends with former BYU basketball player Brandon Davies.

Van Noy proposed to Marissa Powell, the former Miss Utah USA winner and third runner-up in the 2013 Miss USA pageant, in December 2013. They were married in June 2014. Van Noy has said that on one of their early dates, when he told Powell he was adopted, she responded that her father and brother were also adopted. Both are members of the Church of Jesus Christ of Latter-day Saints. The couple have a son Trae Legend, and a daughter Giavanna Monnae. Van Noy is an avid golfer and founded Chirpin Golf, a golf apparel company.

== Philanthropy ==
In 2014, Van Noy and his wife Marissa co-founded the Van Noy Valor Foundation, a nonprofit organization whose stated mission is to “encourage personal valor in the lives of adopted children, those in foster care, and disadvantaged youth by armoring them with success.” Both Van Noy and Powell have personal connections to adoption; Van Noy was adopted as an infant, and Powell’s father and brother were also adopted.

The foundation’s signature annual event, “A Very Van Noy Christmas,” provides foster families with Christmas trees, holiday meals, and gifts. The event has been held in both Utah and Baltimore. Van Noy has also worked with adoption organizations during his playing career, including visiting with children from Adoption Rhode Island during his time with the New England Patriots.

Van Noy has spoken publicly about using his platform to reduce the stigma around adoption and foster care. In a 2020 interview with the Miami Dolphins’ website, he said: “People would throw shade like ‘oh, you’re adopted,’ almost like it’s a bad thing. These kids in foster care didn’t sign up for it. … I’m just trying to bring a positive light and a positive energy to it.” He was named a finalist for the Art Rooney Sportsmanship Award, voted on by NFL players, in both 2024 and 2025.

== Media and other ventures ==
In 2019, Van Noy launched a YouTube channel called "Vibin' with the Van Noy's", which includes a restaurant-review series titled "Elite Eatz". In the series, Van Noy visits local restaurants with NFL teammates, including Stephon Gilmore, Matthew Judon, Damien Harris, Kendrick Bourne, and Jakobi Meyers. The show received coverage from outlets including time out Boston, the today show, and Boston.com. A 2021 episode featuring Jakobi Meyers was widely cited in sports media after Meyers discussed his motivation for signing with the Patriots as an undrafted free agent.

In 2025, Van Noy launched "One More Shot", a newsletter on the platform Substack, in which he writes about topics including leadership, mindset, and his experiences in professional football. The publication's name reflects a recurring theme in Van Noy's career, in which he has rebuilt his role on multiple teams after being released or unsigned.

Van Noy is also an avid golfer. He founded Chirpin Golf, a golf apparel brand. In March 2023, he recorded a hole-in-one at Pelican Hill Golf Club in Newport Beach, California, using a 56-degree wedge from 105 yards on the South Course. He has competed in the NFLPA Classic golf tournament alongside Ravens teammate Marlon Humphrey and hosts the annual Van Noy Charity Golf Challenge at Black Desert Resort in St. George, Utah, as a fundraiser for the Van Noy Valor Foundation.
