= Teddye Buchanan =

American football player (born 2002)

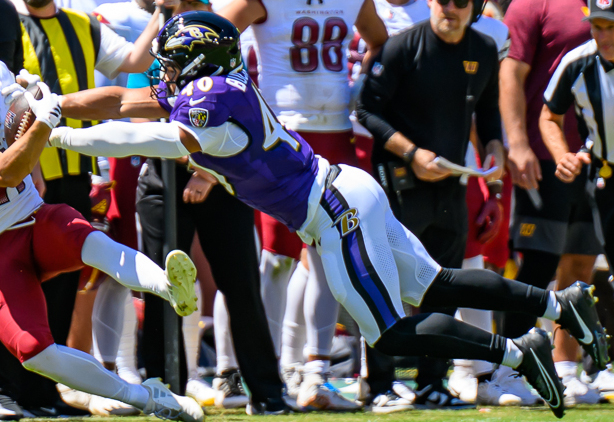
- Buchanan with the Baltimore Ravens in 2025

No. 40 – Baltimore Ravens
- Position: Linebacker
- Roster status: Active

Personal information
- Born: October 3, 2002 (age 24); Palo Alto, California, U.S.
- Listed height: 6 ft 2 in (1.88 m)
- Listed weight: 240 lb (109 kg)

Career information
- High school: St. Ignatius College Preparatory (San Francisco, California)
- College: UC Davis (2020–2023); California (2024)
- NFL draft: 2025: 4th round, 129th overall pick

Career history
- Baltimore Ravens (2025–present)

Awards and highlights
- PFWA NFL All-Rookie Team (2025); First-team All-ACC (2024)

Career NFL statistics as of Week 5, 2026
- Tackles: 96
- Sacks: 0.5
- Forced fumbles: 1
- Pass deflections: 1
- Stats at Pro Football Reference

Teddye Buchanan (born October 3, 2002) is an American professional football linebacker for the Baltimore Ravens of the National Football League (NFL). He played college football for the UC Davis Aggies and California Golden Bears. Buchanan was selected by the Ravens in the fourth round of the 2025 NFL draft.

== Early life ==
Buchanan attended St. Ignatius College Preparatory in San Francisco, California. He played both linebacker and quarterback in high school. As a senior, he completed 205 of 249 passes for 1,785 yards with 18 passing touchdowns, 557 rushing yards and nine rushing touchdowns on offense and 83 tackles and six sacks on defense. Buchanan committed to the University of California, Davis to play college football.

== College career ==
Buchanan played at UC Davis from 2020 to 2023. He played in 36 games and had 208 tackles, four sacks and eight interceptions. After the 2023 season, he transferred to the University of California, Berkeley. In his lone season at Cal in 2024, he was named All-ACC after recording 114 tackles and five sacks.

== Professional career ==
Pre-draft measurables
Height	Weight	Arm length	Hand span	Wingspan	40-yard dash	10-yard split	20-yard split	20-yard shuttle	Three-cone drill	Vertical jump	Broad jump	Bench press
6 ft 2 1/8 in (1.88 m)	233 lb (106 kg)	31 3/8 in (0.80 m)	9 3/8 in (0.24 m)	6 ft 3 3/8 in (1.91 m)	4.60 s	1.59 s	2.70 s	4.27 s	7.24 s	40.0 in (1.02 m)	10 ft 5 in (3.18 m)	26 reps
All values from NFL Combine/Pro Day

Buchanan was selected by the Baltimore Ravens in the fourth round (129th overall) at the 2025 NFL draft. He was named AFC Defensive Rookie of the Month for the month of October. During the Ravens' shutout win against the Cincinnati Bengals on December 14, 2025, Buchanan suffered a torn ACL, ending his season. He finished the season with 93 tackles, 0.5 sacks, one forced fumble, and a pass deflection through 14 games and 13 starts. After the season, he was named to the PFWA All-Rookie Team.

== NFL career statistics ==
Year	Team	Games		Tackles						Interceptions						Fumbles	
Year	Team	GP	GS	Cmb	Solo	Ast	Sck	TFL	Sfty	PD	Int	Yds	TD	Avg	Lng	FF	FR
2025	BAL	14	13	93	49	44	0.5	5	0	1	0	0	0	0.0	0	1	0
2026	BAL	3	0	3	2	1	0.0	0	0	0	0	0	0	0.0	0	0	0
Career		17	13	96	51	45	0.5	5	0	1	0.0	0	0	3	0	1	0
