= 2025 UFL season =

Second season of the UFL

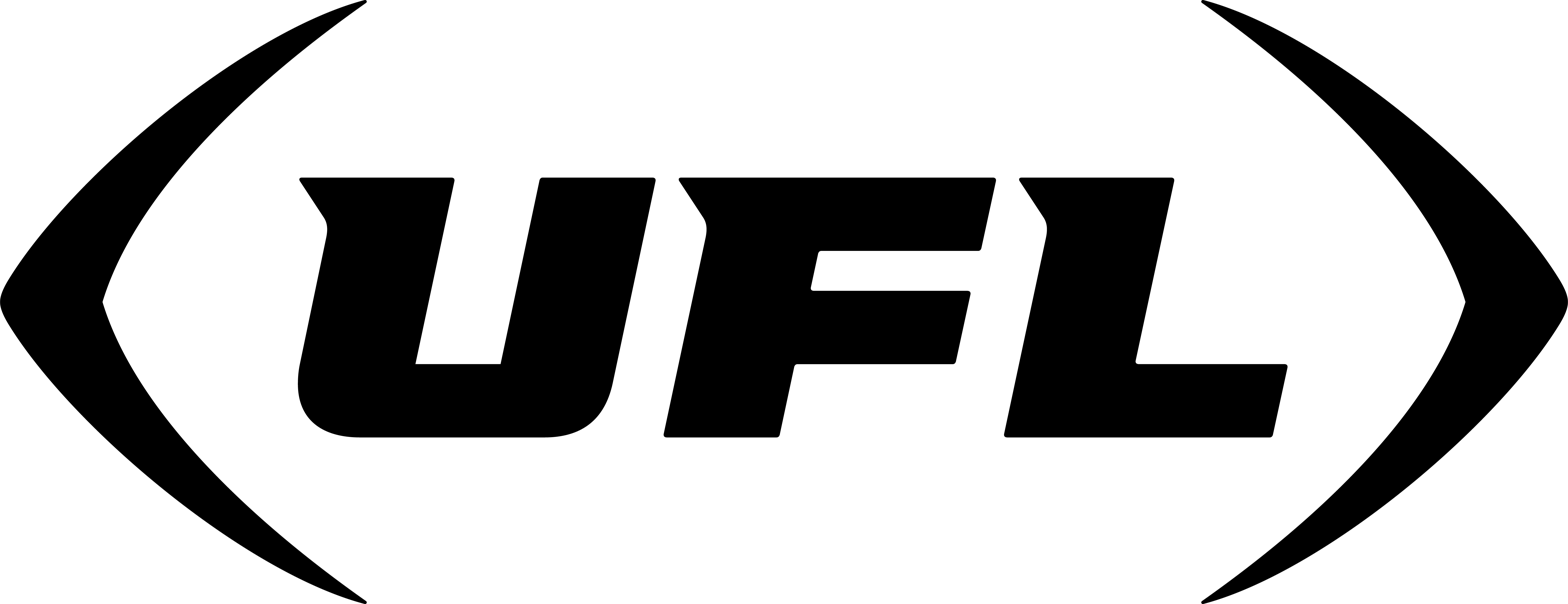
- League: United Football League
- Sport: American football
- Duration: Regular season: March 28 – June 1 Playoffs: June 8 – 14
- Games: 43 (40 regular-season games, 3 postseason games)
- Teams: 8
- TV partner(s): ABC, ESPN, ESPN2, Fox, FS1
- Streaming partner(s): ESPN+, Fox Sports app

Draft
- Top draft pick: Jason Bean (QB)
- Picked by: Memphis Showboats
- Season MVP: Bryce Perkins

Playoffs
- USFL champions: Michigan Panthers
- USFL runners-up: Birmingham Stallions
- XFL champions: DC Defenders
- XFL runners-up: St. Louis Battlehawks

2025 UFL Championship
- Venue: The Dome at America's Center, St. Louis, Missouri
- Champions: DC Defenders
- Runners-up: Michigan Panthers
- Finals MVP: Jordan Ta'amu

Seasons
- ← 2024 2026 →

The 2025 UFL season was the second season of the United Football League. The Birmingham Stallions were the defending champions after they defeated the San Antonio Brahmas in the 2024 UFL championship game to win their third consecutive spring football championship, adding to their back-to-back championships in the rebooted USFL. The Stallions were defeated in the 2025 USFL championship game by the Michigan Panthers, and the DC Defenders routed the Panthers 58–34 to win their first UFL Championship.

== Offseason ==
Fox Sports executive Eric Shanks commented about the UFL for the 2024 season that though the league still lost money, it was "ahead of the expected pace" in terms of achieving self-sustenance. The league's long-term goal was to solicit local investors in an owner-operator arrangement similar to that used by Major League Soccer and the previous United Football League. League president Russ Brandon confirmed that the league's losses in 2024 were smaller than anticipated. No numbers were made public regarding the league's financial losses, revenues, or expenses. Still, the XFL had projected revenue of $100 million for 2024 if the leagues had remained separate, compared to its $80 million intake in 2023. The outpacing of expectations came despite the short ramp-up time for the 2024 season and the complications it posed on the business side of the league, which Vice President of Football Operations Daryl Johnston blamed for some of the attendance underperformance of the 2024 season compared to years past. Later reports suggested that the 2025 season would be the league's last one if it did not achieve tremendous commercial success.

Television viewership rose substantially compared to the previous season as separate leagues. At the same time, ticket sales in most cities fell, prompting the league ownership to pivot investment toward local ticket sales teams. The inaugural season of the UFL averaged 832,000 viewers per game this season, a 34% increase from the average of 619,000 viewers the USFL and XFL attracted last year. In comparison, the championship game on Fox drew the highest viewership, with 1.596 million viewers. However, attendance dipped from the XFL's 2023 season average of 14,703 to 13,512.

In an interview after the season. Johnston said: "With our home markets, we’ve got to build that trust there — that we’re not going to leave or [that] the league isn't going to fold. We’ve got a couple of cities that historically have been a part of spring football; they've committed to a team, and that team has left. ... We’ve still got some trust to build in our home markets. We are going to be able to dial into the details. We will have a traditional offseason calendar where we can be ahead of the curve instead of being in a position where we have to chase it a little bit". In an October 2024 statement, chairwoman Dany Garcia highlighted two areas of improvement for the league in 2025: the league sought to improve its ties to local markets and the quality of play compared to 2024 for a more "dynamic" on-field product. In January 2025 interview UFL President Russ Brandon provided more details: "We have teams on the ground in each market, business teams, think AA, Triple A, baseball, front of offices that are on the ground, 365 days a year, promoting and singing the tune of what that brand means in that marketplace".

77 UFL players signed with the NFL for their 2024 preseason; of those, 21 players were on NFL rosters on opening week, including active rosters, practice squads, and injured reserve, with two players — Jake Bates and Jalen Redmond — making the 53 roster for week 1. Minnesota Vikings general manager Kwesi Adofo-Mensah would later praise the UFL for its role in player development: "Growth opportunities afforded by the UFL can lead to better competition on NFL rosters. If players in the UFL ascend through the opportunity with professional organizations and access to continued coaching and structure, that provides us with valuable information to evaluate if those ascending players fit the characteristics we target to bring potential added value and competition to our roster".

The league's sponsorship agreement with the United States Army was not renewed after the 2024 season, after league co-owner Dwayne Johnson failed to deliver on the promised number of personal social media posts in the 2024 agreement.

== Teams ==
As one of the conditions for approving the merger of the XFL and USFL, federal regulators were said to have "prefer(red) more opportunities" (eventual expansion teams) than the eight teams that were included in the 2024 season. No such expansion is planned for 2025, nor are any relocations, as Daryl Johnston stated that the ticket sales in most of the poorer-selling markets could be improved by showing stability and following a more "traditional offseason calendar." In November 2024 the UFL announced the opening of an expansion window for no sooner than 2026, seeking out and inviting cities to present proposals for potential future expansion; a final decision on 2026 expansion is anticipated by the time of the 2025 UFL Championship in June. As of March 2025, Johnston stated that while they were looking to "creatively" tie into the league's extensive ties to the state of Texas, the UFL would not be restricting its expansion to the league's current geographic footprint and would instead take a holistic approach to determining what cities would have a realistic chance of successfully hosting a UFL team. League executive David Dykeman stated that two teams would be announced as expansion franchises at some point in 2025.

The UFL has maintained the Aviators brand from The Spring League, the only remaining trademark it has retained from that league, for future use for one of the teams; UFL News Hub, a Web site dedicated to covering the league, noted that it had anticipated Columbus, Ohio—from a state with a slogan "birthplace of aviation," a famous college football rivalry with Michigan, and a history of hosting USFL games in 2022 and 2023 in Canton—would, along with a revival of the Seattle Sea Dragons, be the most likely candidates for expansion. Pro Football Newsroom likewise predicted a Columbus expansion, noting that Raleigh, North Carolina was also being seriously considered in the event Seattle could not return. The UFL renewed four trademarks tied to USFL legacy properties, including those of the Tampa Bay Bandits, New Jersey Generals, and Philadelphia Stars (all teams that had been re-established in 2022 but did not make the merger with the UFL), along with the 1980s-era USFL's Oakland Invaders, in late May 2025. The Invaders revival proposal is reportedly being backed by Tom Brady, a former NFL quarterback and current Fox color commentator who was born and raised in the area and currently owns a minority stake in the Las Vegas Raiders. A later filing renewed the Oklahoma Outlaws, a state with two of the UFL's strongest local television ratings markets in Tulsa and Oklahoma City.

Ultimately, 31 cities submitted expansion bids. Boise, Idaho had progressed to the point of a verbal agreement in May 2025 to place an expansion team at Albertsons Stadium. The league eventually chose not to expand for 2026 but would locate three of the existing teams to new markets: Columbus, Louisville and Orlando.

On September 13, 2024, the Houston Roughnecks announced that they would be returning to TDECU Stadium (which would be renamed Space City Financial Stadium during the offseason) for the 2025 season, following renovations to that stadium. The previous incarnation of the Roughnecks had played at TDECU in 2020 and 2023; the current Roughnecks had played the 2024 season at Rice Stadium while Space City Financial Stadium was being renovated. On August it was reported that the Battlehawks will host six games in 2025, taking one home game from the Brahmas, as a result of the Alamodome major event commitments for the months of April, May and June. The Brahmas' home schedule is expected to be backloaded with the four home games concentrated toward the end of the 2025 season to minimize scheduling conflicts; league president Russ Brandon stated that it had considered moving the Brahmas to another stadium in the San Antonio metropolitan area but decided against it to avoid "some very complex operational concerns" that would arise by doing so.

The Michigan Panthers' lease on Ford Field expired following the 2024 season, forcing a delay in the sale of season tickets for that team. The league announced a renewal for the 2025 season on October 29, 2024.

Teams in the 2025 UFL season
| Conference | Team | Location | Stadium | Capacity | First season | Head coach |
|---|---|---|---|---|---|---|
| USFL Conference | Birmingham Stallions | Birmingham, Alabama | Protective Stadium | 47,100 | 2022 | Skip Holtz |
| USFL Conference | Houston Roughnecks | Houston, Texas | Space City Financial Stadium | 40,000 | 2022 | Curtis Johnson |
| USFL Conference | Memphis Showboats | Memphis, Tennessee | Simmons Bank Liberty Stadium | 44,000 | 2023 | Ken Whisenhunt (weeks 2–3); Jim Turner (week 1, 4–10) |
| USFL Conference | Michigan Panthers | Detroit, Michigan | Ford Field | 65,000 | 2022 | Mike Nolan |
| XFL Conference | Arlington Renegades | Arlington, Texas | Choctaw Stadium | 48,114 | 2020 | Bob Stoops |
| XFL Conference | DC Defenders | Washington, D.C. | Audi Field | 20,000 | 2020 | Shannon Harris |
| XFL Conference | San Antonio Brahmas | San Antonio, Texas | Alamodome | 64,000 | 2023 | Wade Phillips (weeks 1–3); Payton Pardee (weeks 4–10) |
| XFL Conference | St. Louis Battlehawks | St. Louis, Missouri | The Dome at America's Center | 67,277 | 2020 | Anthony Becht |

Locations of current teams for the 2025 UFL season, (USFL Conference – red; XFL Conference – blue)

== Players ==
Each team will carry 64-man rosters to training camp, compared to 75 in the 2024 season, with regular season rosters set at 50 (43 active on game day).

During the 2025 offseason, the UFL hosted seven player showcases across the United States from July to November in St. Louis, Washington D.C., Atlanta, Houston, Orlando, San Diego and Dallas, with selected players being included in the next UFL Draft.

On September 7, 2024, Memphis Showboats wide receiver Diondre Overton died in a shooting incident.

=== Unionization ===
On August 12, 2024, the United Football League Players Association released a statement announcing that United Steelworkers, which had represented the association (and its predecessor for the USFL), would no longer represent the league's players. The statement also strongly recommended that the players organize under another established union and not affiliate with the United Football Players Association, with which the USW and UFLPA had fallen out in 2023, without a "confidential background check." Despite this warning, on October 12, the UFPA issued a statement claiming the UFL players had ratified an agreement establishing the UFPA as their union, and that the National Labor Relations Board (NLRB) had recognized the vote. Negotiations on a new collective bargaining agreement began in December.

On February 22, 2025, the UFPA issued a public letter signed by the 24 quarterbacks under UFL contract that collectively declared a short strike against the upcoming minicamp; the letter declared a proposal to continue the terms of the previous collective bargaining agreement negotiated by the USW as "negligible," "unacceptable and disgusting." The letter demanded major raises and year-round health insurance. The quarterbacks, along with the rest of the UFL's players, reported to training camp on time as negotiations continued; the UFPA was reportedly satisfied enough not to pursue a full strike but not enough to agree to the most recent proposal put forth by the league. Rumors of a boycott of the UFL media days on March 6 and 7 did not materialize, in part because the UFL coaches collectively showed willingness to discipline any player who missed any team activities, up to including dismissal. Johnston also stated that the UFPA's actions posed "no threat" to the start of the UFL regular season. The National Football League Players Association would later issued a statement supporting the UFL players during the CBA negotiations. Showboats quarterback Quinten Dormady alleged that his active involvement in the UFPA and the minicamp strike was a factor in the Showboats' decision to cut him from the roster despite being in contention for the starting position, an allegation that the league denied.

The UFPA filed a complaint with the NLRB alleging the UFL had committed multiple illegal labor practices on March 14. In a statement to ESPN March 25, Kai Nacua stated that the players would collectively decide whether or not to hold a full strike in the coming days, and that a substantial number of the league's players were preparing to play despite the fact that, without a collective bargaining agreement, the league's players were technically not under contract.

On April 18, 2025, the UFPA announced it had ratified a new collective bargaining agreement raising minimum pay to $6,200 per game (up from the $5,500 per game under the previous agreement) and $6,400 per game in 2026, and an extension of health insurance coverage from the previous four months to seven months, and the remaining five months being covered by giving the players access under COBRA. In exchange for the jump in pay, the $4,000 annual housing stipend was integrated into the base salary. As was the case under the previous CBA, and with the XFL before it, teams are free to pay select players above the minimum; most of the starting quarterbacks are believed to be making between $100,000 and $250,000 per year, with the UFL being intentionally silent in neither confirming nor denying this. The agreement will expire following the end of the 2026 season. The deal was brokered by Harry Marino.

=== Draft ===
The 2024 UFL draft ahead of the 2025 season, was held on July 17, 2024. The draft consisted of 10 rounds of players who were eligible for the 2024 NFL draft in April but went undrafted. Memphis, winner of the first overall draft pick as a result of its week 10 victory in 2024, chose quarterback Jason Bean with the selection. Bean declined to sign with the Showboats and chose to remain with the Indianapolis Colts, with whom he had signed as an undrafted free agent in 2024. Despite this, Bean has been written about by multiple press outlets as being a member of the Showboats in the lead-up to the 2025 season, including participating in the QB minicamp strike even though he has no affiliation with the Showboats or the UFL.

=== Player movement ===
The UFL has an allocation process for players who entered professional football in the past three years or less (that is, players who were drafted in 2022 onward). Until November 30, each player in this category is allocated based upon the NFL team that last signed them, with each UFL team being assigned four teams:

- Arlington Renegades: Arizona, Cleveland, Dallas, Pittsburgh
- Birmingham Stallions: Atlanta, Carolina, Los Angeles Chargers, Los Angeles Rams
- DC Defenders: Baltimore, Kansas City, Philadelphia, Washington
- Houston Roughnecks: Cincinnati, Houston, Indianapolis, Las Vegas
- Memphis Showboats: Jacksonville, Miami, Tampa Bay, Tennessee
- Michigan Panthers: Chicago, Detroit, Green Bay, Minnesota
- San Antonio Brahmas: Buffalo, New England, New York Giants, New York Jets
- St. Louis Battlehawks: Denver, New Orleans, San Francisco, Seattle

From December 1, 2024, onward, all eight teams are free to sign any player not currently under contract to another professional team. Players who entered professional football in 2021 or earlier, or had never signed with an NFL team, are free agents at any time.

Some form of reserve clause exists for players who had previously been under contract to another UFL team in 2024 that gives that team first rights to that player for 2025 even if their contract had expired; the exact mechanism of this is unclear. A. J. McCarron successfully prevented the St. Louis Battlehawks from enforcing a reserve clause on him following the expiration of his contract after the 2024 season ended.

==== Free agency ====
- On November 6, 2024, the Memphis Showboats signed Ravarius Rivers, the 2024 Indoor Football League Defensive Player of the Year.
- On November 15, 2024, the St. Louis Battlehawks released QB A. J. McCarron.
- On January 24, 2025, the Birmingham Stallions signed QB Alex McGough, who had been the USFL MVP as a member of the Stallions in 2023. Though initial reports had indicated McGough had signed as a wide receiver, the position he played in the NFL in 2024, the Stallions later specified he would, in fact, return to the quarterback position.
- On March 10, 2025, the Memphis Showboats released QB Quinten Dormady and RB DeAndre Torrey. Dormady would later claim that he was released because of his participation in union activities amid CBA talks.

==== Trades ====
- On October 24, 2024, QB Quinten Dormady was traded from the San Antonio Brahmas to the Memphis Showboats, in return for EDGE Jordan Ferguson.
- On November 4, 2024, DE Jeremiah Martin was traded to the Birmingham Stallions, in return for DB Jayden Price.
- On November 6, 2024, QB Jalan McClendon was traded to the Houston Roughnecks, in return for DB Kiondre Thomas.
- On November 14, 2024, CB Bryce Thompson was traded from the San Antonio Brahmas to DC Defenders, in return for DE Jalen Harris.
- On April 7, 2025, WR Marcus Simms was traded from the Michigan Panthers to the Houston Roughnecks, in return for OT Cam Carter.
- On April 21, 2025, OT Kellen Deisch was traded from the Arlington Renegades to the Memphis Showboats, in return for OG J. D. DiRenzo.
- On April 29, 2025, LB Storey Jackson was traded from the Arlington Renegades to the San Antonio Brahmas, in return for EDGE Ikenna Enechukwu.

==== Retirements ====
- On the first week on training camp, the Battlehawks announced the retirement of DE Kobe Smith and RB Mataeo Durant.

== Coaches ==
Three of the four coaches who came into the UFL by way of the XFL—Arlington's Bob Stoops, St. Louis's Anthony Becht and DC's Reggie Barlow—are believed to be reaching the end of their guaranteed XFL contracts, and will be subject to new terms that the USFL coaches and all assistants agreed upon in 2024 that were less generous than the 2023 XFL's were. (The lone exception, San Antonio's Wade Phillips, is on the second year of a two-year contract extension he signed prior to the merger.) Stoops, the league's longest-tenured coach and the only remaining coach from the inaugural 2020 XFL season, was noncommittal about returning after the 2024 season, stating he was open to returning for 2025 but that "you never know what the structure is going to look like." Stoops confirmed his return on February 5, 2025, on which day six of the UFL teams announced their coaching staffs. Becht announced he had committed to a third season as the Battlehawks' coach in August 2024.

| Team | Departing coach | Incoming coach | Reason for leaving | Notes |
|---|---|---|---|---|
| Memphis Showboats | John DeFilippo | Ken Whisenhunt | Resigned | DeFilippo had coached the Showboats in 2024 after coaching the contracted New Orleans Breakers in 2023, with a combined record of 9-11 (.450), with his season with the Breakers at 7-3 (.700) and the Showboats at 2-8 (.200). His resignation coincides with the resignation of general manager Dennis Polian. Whisenhunt had spent the 2023 and part of the 2024 seasons as special assistant to head coach Kalen DeBoer at Alabama, as head coach and offensive coordinator; he had extensive experience as an offensive coordinator at the college and NFL levels, and two stints as an NFL head coach for the Arizona Cardinals and Tennessee Titans. He was hired along with new general manager Jim Monos September 23, 2024. |
| DC Defenders | Reggie Barlow | Shannon Harris | Resigned | Barlow resigned March 23, 2025, one week before the start of the regular season, to accept the head coach position at Tennessee State. He had a record of 14-8 (.636) over two seasons as coach, including a North Division championship and appearance in the 2023 XFL Championship Game (a loss to Arlington). Harris, the Defenders' quarterback coach, wil take over the position. This was somewhat of a surprise, as he was chosen ahead of the more experienced Gregg Williams for the position and preliminary reports had suggested Williams (the Defenders' defensive coordinator) would be the Defenders' head coach. Days after the decision, Barlow indicated that Harris would be joining him at Tennessee State, later clarifying that Harris and the Defenders coaching staff would finish out the season in DC before joining him at Tennessee State. |

=== In-season ===
| Team | Departing coach | Incoming coach | Reason for leaving | Notes |
|---|---|---|---|---|
| Memphis Showboats | Ken Whisenhunt | Jim Turner | Resigned | Whisenhunt suddenly took an indefinite leave of absence on March 24, 2025, citing personal reasons. Turner, the team's offensive line coach who had carried over from the previous two Showboats staffs, was promoted to interim head coach; this is Turner's first head coaching position after 30 years as an offensive line coach mostly at the college level. Whisenhunt returned from leave after Week 1, coached the next two games, then permanently resigned after the Week 3 contest on April 16, with a record of 0–2. |
| San Antonio Brahmas | Wade Phillips | Payton Pardee | Medical leave | Phillips announced a personal leave of absence April 16, one that is expected to last through the end of the 2025 season (and thus through the end of Phillips's current contract, marking a de facto resignation), following an 0–3 start to the 2025 season. He had suffered a health emergency during the Brahmas's game against the Michigan Panthers on April 13 that had forced Pardee to take over head coaching duties midway through the game. He finishes his UFL tenure with a record of 15–11 (.577) counting his time with the Brahmas and the original Houston Roughnecks, including two playoff appearances and an appearance in the 2024 UFL championship game. Pardee, the grandson of Jack Pardee, began the season as wide receivers/special teams coach before being promoted to offensive coordinator just one week before being named head coach. |

== Rule changes ==
- The UFL switched to the kickoff formation used by the XFL. Though vice president of football operations Daryl Johnston disliked the formation and fought against its adoption, he concluded that the NFL was going to make the formation, which it had adopted as a one-year trial for 2024, a permanent rule for 2025, and thus reluctantly dropped his opposition. As part of the change, the onside kick became prohibited (the XFL had previously allowed for traditional onside kicks if they were declared); Thus, the onside scrimmage play remained as the sole option for a team to retain possession after a score.
- A team will receive a second coach's challenge if their first is successful. Previously, teams were granted only one challenge regardless of the outcome of the replay review. No challenges allowed during the final two minutes of each half nor overtime.

== Season structure ==
=== Preseason ===
This is the third year of the league's agreement with Arlington, Texas, to serve as the league's centralized hub. The league renewed its agreement with Arlington to serve as the UFL headquarters on January 29, 2025.

Preseason schedule:

- February 24-27: Coaches reported for Training camp.
- February 27: Players reported to Training camp.
- February 28-March 2: Players Onboarding.
- March 3: Start of Training camps.
- March 8: Informal scrimmages/Joint Practices.
- March 15: Informal scrimmages/Joint Practices.
- March 21: Roster cut down to 50 players.

=== Regular season ===
The league is divided into two conferences, the USFL Conference and the XFL Conference, each a continuation of its respective league. Each team will play a ten-game schedule with no bye weeks, playing two games against each conference rival (one home and one away) and one game against each team in the other conference, all eight teams playing in their home markets, starting on March 28.

Due to an increase in stadium conflicts with the Alamodome in 2025 compared to previous years, in particular the dome's hosting of the 2025 NCAA Division I men's basketball tournament Final Four, the San Antonio Brahmas will only host four home games in 2025. Both of the Brahmas' in-division games against the St. Louis Battlehawks will be hosted at The Dome at America's Center in St. Louis, giving the Battlehawks six home games.

In attempt to increase each team home attendance, all eight teams will have a specific themes of each of their respective home games for the 2025 season.

=== Postseason ===
The postseason had four teams, with the top-seeded and runner up team in each conference playing in the XFL Championship Game and USFL Championship Game, the winners of which advanced to the 2025 UFL Championship Game on June 14, which was held at the Dome at America's Center in St. Louis. A midseason proposal, previously suggested prior to the 2024 season, to adjust the playoff format to replace the conference championship games with a broader playoff featuring each conference regular season winner and two wild cards was rejected.

The postseason field was set after the end of week 8 of the regular season, due to all four seeds clinching their bids by then. Two of the four teams were unable to host playoff games, DC due to a stadium conflict with the 2025 FIFA Club World Cup and Michigan (reportedly) due to an extremely high stadium rental fee, leading to the other two teams receiving hosting of the playoffs by default.

== Standings ==
2025 UFL standings
USFL Conference
| Team | W | L | PCT | GB | TD+/- | TD+ | TD- | DIV | PF | PA | DIFF | STK |
|---|---|---|---|---|---|---|---|---|---|---|---|---|
| (y) Birmingham Stallions | 7 | 3 | .700 | – | 8 | 28 | 20 | 5–1 | 244 | 167 | 77 | W2 |
| (x) Michigan Panthers | 6 | 4 | .600 | 1 | 8 | 30 | 22 | 3–3 | 245 | 198 | 47 | L2 |
| (e) Houston Roughnecks | 5 | 5 | .500 | 2 | 0 | 22 | 22 | 3–3 | 183 | 201 | -18 | W2 |
| (e) Memphis Showboats | 2 | 8 | .200 | 5 | -13 | 15 | 28 | 1–5 | 148 | 246 | -98 | L2 |
XFL Conference
| Team | W | L | PCT | GB | TD+/- | TD+ | TD- | DIV | PF | PA | DIFF | STK |
| (y) St. Louis Battlehawks | 8 | 2 | .800 | – | 7 | 26 | 19 | 4–2 | 231 | 163 | 68 | W6 |
| (x) DC Defenders | 6 | 4 | .600 | 2 | 3 | 28 | 25 | 4–2 | 225 | 224 | 1 | L2 |
| (e) Arlington Renegades | 5 | 5 | .500 | 3 | 4 | 23 | 19 | 3–3 | 229 | 168 | 61 | W2 |
| (e) San Antonio Brahmas | 1 | 9 | .100 | 7 | -17 | 14 | 31 | 1–5 | 136 | 274 | -138 | L6 |
(x)–clinched playoff berth; (y)–clinched conference; (e)–eliminated from playoff contention

== Season schedule ==
All games stream on ESPN+ or Fox Sports app unless otherwise noted.

=== Regular season ===
==== Week 1 ====
| Date | Time | Away team | Result | | Home team | Stadium | Attendance | Broadcast | Viewership (millions) | Rating | Refs |
|---|---|---|---|---|---|---|---|---|---|---|---|
| March 28 | 8:00 p.m. ET | St. Louis Battlehawks | 31 | 6 | Houston Roughnecks | Space City Financial Stadium | 7,124 | Fox | 0.69 | 0.7 | |
| March 29 | 4:00 p.m. ET | San Antonio Brahmas | 9 | 33 | Arlington Renegades | Choctaw Stadium | 10,114 | Fox | 0.58 | 0.6 | |
| March 30 | 12:00 p.m. ET | Michigan Panthers | 26 | 12 | Memphis Showboats | Simmons Bank Liberty Stadium | 4,373 | ESPN | 0.57 | 0.6 | |
| March 30 | 3:00 p.m. ET | Birmingham Stallions | 11 | 18 | DC Defenders | Audi Field | 12,254 | ESPN | 0.40 | 0.4 | |

==== Week 2 ====
| Date | Time | Away team | Result | | Home team | Stadium | Attendance | Broadcast | Viewership (millions) | Rating | Refs |
|---|---|---|---|---|---|---|---|---|---|---|---|
| April 4 | 8:00 p.m. ET | Birmingham Stallions | 21 | 12 | Michigan Panthers | Ford Field | 10,049 | Fox | 0.66 | 0.7 | |
| April 5 | 8:00 p.m. ET | Memphis Showboats | 12 | 17 | DC Defenders | Audi Field | 13,142 | ABC | 0.62 | 0.6 | |
| April 6 | 12:00 p.m. ET | Houston Roughnecks | 9 | 11 | Arlington Renegades | Choctaw Stadium | 9,582 | ESPN | 0.61 | 0.6 | |
| April 6 | 6:30 p.m. ET | San Antonio Brahmas | 9 | 26 | St. Louis Battlehawks | The Dome at America's Center | 32,115 | FS1 | 0.52 | 0.5 | |

==== Week 3 ====
| Date | Time | Away team | Result | | Home team | Stadium | Attendance | Broadcast | Viewership (millions) | Rating | Refs |
|---|---|---|---|---|---|---|---|---|---|---|---|
| April 11 | 8:00 p.m. ET | Arlington Renegades | 9 | 10 | Birmingham Stallions | Protective Stadium | 10,126 | Fox | 0.68 | 0.7 | |
| April 12 | 2:30 p.m. ET | Houston Roughnecks | 18 | 17 | Memphis Showboats | Simmons Bank Liberty Stadium | 4,753 | ESPN | 0.30 | 0.3 | |
| April 13 | 12:00 p.m. ET | San Antonio Brahmas | 23 | 26 | Michigan Panthers | Ford Field | 11,013 | ABC | 0.72 | 0.7 | |
| April 13 | 3:00 p.m. ET | DC Defenders | 27 | 15 | St. Louis Battlehawks | The Dome at America's Center | 30,014 | ABC | 0.97 | 1.0 | |

==== Week 4 ====
| Date | Time | Away team | Result | | Home team | Stadium | Attendance | Broadcast | Viewership (millions) | Rating | Refs |
|---|---|---|---|---|---|---|---|---|---|---|---|
| April 18 | 8:00 p.m. ET | Memphis Showboats | 9 | 27 | Michigan Panthers | Ford Field | 9,674 | Fox | 0.68 | 0.7 | |
| April 19 | 12:30 p.m. ET | St. Louis Battlehawks | 15 | 30 | Arlington Renegades | Choctaw Stadium | 9,614 | ABC | 0.90 | 0.9 | |
| April 19 | 7:00 p.m. ET | Birmingham Stallions | 23 | 16 | Houston Roughnecks | Space City Financial Stadium | 6,613 | Fox | 0.61 | 0.6 | |
| April 20 | 5:00 p.m. ET | San Antonio Brahmas | 24 | 18 | DC Defenders | Audi Field | 12,474 | Fox | 0.74 | 0.7 | |

==== Week 5 ====
| Date | Time | Away team | Result | | Home team | Stadium | Attendance | Broadcast | Viewership (millions) | Rating | Refs |
|---|---|---|---|---|---|---|---|---|---|---|---|
| April 25 | 8:00 p.m. ET | Memphis Showboats | 24 (OT) | 20 | Birmingham Stallions | Protective Stadium | 9,127 | Fox | 0.47 | 0.5 | |
| April 26 | 7:00 p.m. ET | Michigan Panthers | 27 | 32 | St. Louis Battlehawks | The Dome at America's Center | 30,406 | ESPN | 0.62 | 0.6 | |
| April 27 | 12:00 p.m. ET | DC Defenders | 37 | 33 | Arlington Renegades | Choctaw Stadium | 9,544 | ESPN | 0.55 | 0.6 | |
| April 27 | 3:00 p.m. ET | Houston Roughnecks | 27 | 3 | San Antonio Brahmas | Alamodome | 14,427 | ESPN | 0.39 | 0.4 | |

==== Week 6 ====
| Date | Time | Away team | Result | | Home team | Stadium | Attendance | Broadcast | Viewership (millions) | Rating | Refs |
|---|---|---|---|---|---|---|---|---|---|---|---|
| May 2 | 8:00 p.m. ET | Arlington Renegades | 6 | 12 | St. Louis Battlehawks | The Dome at America's Center | 26,684 | Fox | 0.63 | 0.6 | |
| May 3 | 12:00 p.m. ET | Memphis Showboats | 20 | 21 | Houston Roughnecks | Space City Financial Stadium | 4,134 | ABC | 0.87 | 0.9 | |
| May 4 | 12:00 p.m. ET | DC Defenders | 14 | 38 | Michigan Panthers | Ford Field | 11,653 | ESPN | 0.45 | 0.5 | |
| May 4 | 4:00 p.m. ET | San Antonio Brahmas | 3 | 26 | Birmingham Stallions | Protective Stadium | 9,627 | Fox | 0.62 | 0.6 | |

==== Week 7 ====
| Date | Time | Away team | Result | | Home team | Stadium | Attendance | Broadcast | Viewership (millions) | Rating | Refs |
|---|---|---|---|---|---|---|---|---|---|---|---|
| May 9 | 8:00 p.m. ET | DC Defenders | 32 | 24 | San Antonio Brahmas | Alamodome | 9,884 | Fox | 0.54 | 0.5 | |
| May 10 | 1:00 p.m. ET | Michigan Panthers | 25 | 24 | Arlington Renegades | Choctaw Stadium | 9,963 | Fox | 0.60 | 0.6 | |
| May 11 | 12:00 p.m. ET | Houston Roughnecks | 25 | 33 | Birmingham Stallions | Protective Stadium | 4,744 | ABC | 0.96 | 1.0 | |
| May 11 | 3:00 p.m. ET | St. Louis Battlehawks | 19 | 9 | Memphis Showboats | Simmons Bank Liberty Stadium | 4,215 | ESPN | 0.23 | 0.2 | |

==== Week 8 ====
| Date | Time | Away team | Result | | Home team | Stadium | Attendance | Broadcast | Viewership (millions) | Rating | Refs |
|---|---|---|---|---|---|---|---|---|---|---|---|
| May 16 | 8:00 p.m. ET | Memphis Showboats | 24 (OT) | 22 | San Antonio Brahmas | Alamodome | 9,244 | Fox | 0.57 | 0.6 | |
| May 17 | 1:00 p.m. ET | Michigan Panthers | 30 | 18 | Houston Roughnecks | Space City Financial Stadium | 4,007 | Fox | 0.59 | 0.6 | |
| May 17 | 1:00 p.m. ET | Birmingham Stallions | 28 | 29 | St. Louis Battlehawks | The Dome at America's Center | 30,114 | Fox | 0.59 | 0.6 | |
| May 18 | 12:00 p.m. ET | Arlington Renegades | 30 | 33 | DC Defenders | Audi Field | 14,638 | ABC | 0.97 | 1.0 | |

==== Week 9 ====
| Date | Time | Away team | Result | | Home team | Stadium | Attendance | Broadcast | Viewership (millions) | Rating | Refs |
|---|---|---|---|---|---|---|---|---|---|---|---|
| May 23 | 8:00 p.m. ET | St. Louis Battlehawks | 39 | 13 | San Antonio Brahmas | The Dome at America's Center (Note: This game was originally intended to be played in San Antonio but was shifted to be played in St. Louis due to scheduling conflicts at the Alamodome. San Antonio was the designated home team for this game.) | 27,890 | Fox | 0.54 | 0.5 | |
| May 24 | 3:00 p.m. ET | Arlington Renegades | 30 | 12 | Memphis Showboats | Simmons Bank Liberty Stadium | 2,044 | ESPN3 | N/A | N/A | |
| May 24 | 3:00 p.m. ET | Michigan Panthers | 22 | 26 | Birmingham Stallions | Protective Stadium | 10,344 | ABC | 0.97 | 1.0 | |
| May 25 | 4:00 p.m. ET | DC Defenders | 21 | 24 | Houston Roughnecks | Space City Financial Stadium | 6,684 | Fox | 1.35 | 1.4 | |

==== Week 10 ====
| Date | Time | Away team | Result | | Home team | Stadium | Attendance | Broadcast | Viewership (millions) | Rating | Refs |
|---|---|---|---|---|---|---|---|---|---|---|---|
| May 30 | 8:00 p.m. ET | St. Louis Battlehawks | 13 | 8 | DC Defenders | Audi Field | 12,624 | Fox | 0.67 | 0.7 | |
| May 31 | 3:00 p.m. ET | Houston Roughnecks | 19 | 12 | Michigan Panthers | Ford Field | 16,014 | ESPN | 0.32 | 0.3 | |
| June 1 | 12:00 p.m. ET | Arlington Renegades | 23 | 6 | San Antonio Brahmas | Alamodome | 10,863 | ABC | 0.74 | 0.7 | |
| June 1 | 3:00 p.m. ET | Birmingham Stallions | 46 | 9 | Memphis Showboats | Simmons Bank Liberty Stadium | 4,573 | Fox | 0.63 | 0.6 | |

=== Postseason ===
The playoffs started on June 8 and ended with the championship game on June 14.

Conference finals June 8, 2025
USFL1 | Birmingham Stallions | 29
USFL2 | Michigan Panthers | 44
XFL1 | St. Louis Battlehawks | 18
XFL2 | DC Defenders | 36

UFL championship June 14, 2025
USFL2 | Michigan Panthers | 34
XFL2 | DC Defenders | 58

==== Conference finals ====
| Date | Time | Away team | Result | | Home team | Stadium | Attendance | Broadcast | Viewership (millions) | Rating | Refs |
|---|---|---|---|---|---|---|---|---|---|---|---|
| June 8 | 3:00 p.m. ET | Michigan Panthers | 44 | 29 | Birmingham Stallions | Protective Stadium | 10,928 | ABC | 1.10 | 1.1 | |
| June 8 | 6:00 p.m. ET | DC Defenders | 36 | 18 | St. Louis Battlehawks | The Dome at America's Center | 27,589 | Fox | 0.87 | 0.9 | |

==== UFL championship ====
| Date | Time | Away team | Result | | Home team | Stadium | Attendance | Broadcast | Viewership (millions) | Rating | Refs |
|---|---|---|---|---|---|---|---|---|---|---|---|
| June 14 | 8:00 p.m. ET | Michigan Panthers | 34 | 58 | DC Defenders | The Dome at America's Center | 14,559 | ABC | 0.98 | 1.0 | |

== Attendance ==
Announced attendance figures for each home game. In the weekly columns, dashes (—) indicate away games, while bold font indicates the highest attendance of the week.

| Team / Week | 1 | 2 | 3 | 4 | 5 | 6 | 7 | 8 | 9 | 10 | Conference finals | Championship | Total | Average |
|---|---|---|---|---|---|---|---|---|---|---|---|---|---|---|
| **Arlington Renegades** | 10,114 | 9,582 | — | 9,614 | 9,544 | — | **9,963** | — | — | — | —N/a | —N/a | 48,817 | **9,763** |
| **Birmingham Stallions** | — | — | 10,126 | — | 9,127 | 9,627 | 4,744 | — | 10,344 | — | 10,928 | —N/a | 54,896 | **9,149** |
| **DC Defenders** | **12,254** | 13,142 | — | **12,474** | — | — | — | 14,638 | — | 12,624 | — | **14,559** (St. Louis) | 79,691 | **13,282** |
| **Houston Roughnecks** | 7,124 | — | — | 6,613 | — | 4,134 | — | 4,007 | 6,684 | — | —N/a | —N/a | 28,562 | **5,712** |
| **Memphis Showboats** | 4,373 | — | 4,753 | — | — | — | 4,215 | — | 2,044 | 4,573 | —N/a | —N/a | 19,958 | **3,992** |
| **Michigan Panthers** | — | 10,049 | 11,013 | 9,674 | — | 11,653 | — | — | — | **16,014** | — | — | 58,403 | **11,681** |
| **San Antonio Brahmas** | — | — | — | — | 14,427 | — | 9,884 | 9,244 | — (Note: This game was originally intended to be played in San Antonio but was shifted to be played in St. Louis due to scheduling conflicts at the Alamodome.) | 10,863 | —N/a | —N/a | 44,418 | **11,105** |
| **St. Louis Battlehawks** | — | **32,115** | **30,014** | — | **30,406** | **26,684** | — | **30,114** | **27,890** | — | **27,589** | —N/a | 204,812 | **29,259** |
| Total | 33,865 | 64,888 | 55,906 | 38,375 | 63,504 | 52,098 | 28,806 | 58,003 | 46,962 | 44,074 | 38,517 | 14,559 | 539,557 | |
| Average | 8,466 | 16,222 | 13,977 | 9,594 | 15,876 | 13,025 | 7,202 | 14,501 | 11,741 | 11,019 | 19,259 | 14,559 | | 12,548 |

== Awards ==
=== Players of the week ===
| Week | Offensive Player | | | Defensive Player | | | Special Teams Player | | | Refs. |
| Week | Player | Pos. | Team | Player | Pos. | Team | Player | Pos. | Team | Refs. |
|---|---|---|---|---|---|---|---|---|---|---|
| 1 | Jaryd Jones-Smith, Steven Gonzalez, Mike Panasiuk, Abdul Beecham, and Juwann Bushell-Beatty (Note: After week 1, the United Football League opted to name the entire Battlehawks offensive line as Offensive Player of the Week.) | OL | Battlehawks | Anthony Hines III | LB | Defenders | Matt McCrane | K | Defenders | |
| 2 | Manny Wilkins | QB | Battlehawks | DJ Miller | CB | Panthers | Marquette King | P | Renegades | |
| 3 | Bryce Perkins | QB | Panthers | Andre Mintze | DE | Defenders | Devin Ross | WR | Panthers | |
| 4 | Bryce Perkins (2) | QB | Panthers | Ajene Harris | CB | Renegades | Mathew Sexton | WR | Brahmas | |
| 5 | Dresser Winn | QB | Showboats | Ajene Harris (2) | CB | Renegades | Isiah Hennie | WR | Showboats | |
| 6 | Bryce Perkins (3) | QB | Panthers | Pita Taumoepenu | LB | Battlehawks | Rodrigo Blankenship | K | Battlehawks | |
| 7 | Jordan Ta'amu | QB | Defenders | Joseph Wallace | DT | Defenders | Harrison Mevis | K | Stallions | |
| 8 | Jacob Saylors | RB | Battlehawks | Travis Feeney | OLB | Battlehawks | Samson Nacua | WR | Panthers | |
| 9 | J'Mar Smith | QB | Stallions | Donald Payne | LB | Renegades | Jaden Shirden | RB | Brahmas | |
| 10 | Luis Perez | QB | Renegades | Tae Crowder | LB | Stallions | Xavier Malone | WR | Panthers | |

=== Season Awards ===
Season Awards
| Award | Winner | Position | Team | Ref. |
|---|---|---|---|---|
| Most Valuable Player | Bryce Perkins | QB | Panthers | |
| Offensive Player of the Year | Bryce Perkins | QB | Panthers | |
| Defensive Player of the Year | Pita Taumoepenu | LB | Battlehawks | |
| Special Teams Player of the Year | Kedrick Whitehead Jr. | S | Panthers | |
| Sportsman of the Year | Travis Feeney | LB | Battlehawks | |
| Coach of the Year | Shannon Harris | HC | Defenders | |
| Assistant Coach of the Year | Fred Kaiss | OC | Defenders | |

All-UFL Team
| Position | Player | Team |
|---|---|---|
| QB | Bryce Perkins | Panthers |
| RB | Jashaun Corbin | Brahmas |
| RB | Jacob Saylors | Battlehawks |
| WR | Deon Cain | Stallions |
| WR | Chris Rowland | Defenders |
| WR | Tyler Vaughns | Renegades |
| TE | Sal Cannella | Renegades |
| TE | Gunnar Oakes | Panthers |
| OT | Yasir Durant | Defenders |
| OT | Ryan Nelson | Panthers |
| OG | Cohl Cabral | Panthers |
| OG | Steven Gonzalez | Battlehawks |
| C | Mike Panasiuk | Battlehawks |
| DL | Joe Wallace | Defenders |
| DL | Perrion Winfrey | Stallions |
| EDGE | Derick Roberson | Defenders |
| EDGE | Pita Taumoepenu | Battlehawks |
| LB | Tavante Beckett | Brahmas |
| LB | Willie Harvey Jr. | Battlehawks |
| LB | Anthony Hines | Defenders |
| CB | Deandre Baker | Defenders |
| CB | Ajene Harris | Renegades |
| CB | Kedrick Whitehead Jr. | Panthers |
| S | Leon O'Neal Jr. | Roughnecks |
| S | Arnold Tarpley III | Panthers |
| K | Rodrigo Blankenship | Battlehawks |
| P | Brad Wing | Brahmas |
| LS | Alex Matheson | Battlehawks |
| RS | Chris Rowland | Defenders |

== Statistical leaders ==
2025 UFL statistical leaders (Note: Accurate as of June 2, 2025.)
| Category | Player | Team | Stat |
Offense
| Passing yards | Luis Perez | Arlington Renegades | 2,294 |
| Passing Touchdowns | Jordan Ta'amu | DC Defenders | 17 |
| Rushing yards | Jashaun Corbin | San Antonio Brahmas | 514 |
| Rushing Touchdowns | Toa Taua | Michigan Panthers | 6 |
| Receptions | Justin Hall | Houston Roughnecks | 62 |
| Receiving yards | Siaosi Mariner | Michigan Panthers | 528 |
| Receiving Touchdowns | Cornell Powell | DC Defenders | 7 |
| All-Purpose Yards | Chris Rowland | DC Defenders | 1,070 |
| Touchdowns Scored | Cornell Powell | DC Defenders | 7 |
Defense
| Tackles | Tavante Beckett | San Antonio Brahmas | 89 |
| Sacks | Pita Taumoepenu | St. Louis Battlehawks | 7.5 |
| Interceptions | Ajene Harris | Arlington Renegades | 3 |
Special teams
| Punt return yards | Jahcour Pearson | St. Louis Battlehawks | 294 |
| Kick return yards | Xavier Malone | Michigan Panthers | 516 |
| Field goals made | Lucas Havrisik | Arlington Renegades | 22 |
| Punting yards | Mike Rivers | Houston Roughnecks | 2,019 |

== League finances ==
On January 29, 2025, the UFL announced that Arlington, Texas, will become the year-round football operations home for the league. On February 27, 2025, the league announced a partnership with Salesforce.

=== Personnel ===
- Dany Garcia: Chairperson
- Russ Brandon: President/Chief Executive Officer
- Daryl Johnston: Executive Vice President of Football Operations
- Doug Whaley: Senior Vice President of Player Personnel
- Russ Giglio: Senior Director, Player Administration and Officiating Operations
- Jim Popp: Director of Player Administration
- Dr. Damond Blueitt: Medical Director

== Media ==
=== Television ===
In the United States, the television rights for the UFL are held by Fox and ESPN in the third season of a five-year deal. This season, 10 games, one game each week, will be contested on Friday night on Fox in order to accommodate Fox's new IndyCar deal and to fill a notoriously difficult-to-fill void on the Friday schedule left when WWE SmackDown returned to USA Network. Fox will air nine other regular season games, including one game airing immediately after the 2025 Indianapolis 500, two games will air regionally at the same time, and one game will air on FS1. ESPN will air 20 regular season games across its networks, with nine on ABC, 10 on ESPN and one on ESPN3.

ABC and Fox will then air a conference championship game each. Per a two-year rotation (ABC and Fox), this season's championship game will air on ABC.

All ESPN-produced games will be available to stream on ESPN+. All Fox-produced games may be available via authenticated streaming on the Fox Sports app.

Both ESPN and Fox had contingency plans in the event a strike forced the cancellation of any games in the season. Fox would have carried episodes of game shows like The Masked Singer, Gordon Ramsay's shows like Next Level Chef, and other archival reality programming, or scripted drama and comedy content, also potentially shuffling its other sports content into any vacant slots while ESPN would have filled open airtime with 30 for 30 and other similar documentary programming whenever SportsCenter or other live events could not be moved into the vacant slots.

DAZN announced a streaming agreement to carry the UFL in Latin America, Asia, most of Western Europe, the Middle East and North Africa beginning with Week 2.

==== Broadcasters ====
ESPN announced new broadcast announcing teams for the 2025 season. In order of play-by-play, color commentary and sideline reporter(s):

1. Joe Tessitore, Jordan Rodgers, Sam Acho, Tom Luginbill
2. Mark Jones, Roy Philpott, Roddy Jones, Cole Cubelic, Harry Douglas
3. Lowell Galindo, Kirk Morrison, Eric Mac Lain, Aaron Murray

Murray previously played spring football in the XFL in 2020, and the Alliance of American Football in 2019.

Erin Dolan will serve as a betting analyst for all ESPN broadcasts.

Fox Sports will continue to use Curt Menefee and Joel Klatt as its lead broadcast team. Other play-by-play commentators include Kevin Kugler, Connor Onion and Tim Brando; other color commentators and field analysts include Mark Sanchez, Robert Smith, Brock Huard, Devin Gardner and Jake Butt. Jenny Taft will serve as a sideline reporter for select games.

==== Viewership ====
Week 1 viewership for the UFL set a record for the worst viewership for an opening week of spring football, with none of the four games breaking one million viewers. The first game of the season finished in seventh place in the ratings that night, not only losing to the NCAA men's and women's basketball tournaments on CBS and ESPN respectively, and WWE SmackDown on its new USA Network home, but also drawing less than half the viewers of a figure skating competition on NBC while a rerun of the Shark Tank episode first shown on November 1st 2024 drew nearly four times as many viewers, only airing on ABC because the network could not find alternative programming to replace the show, which aired a new episode the previous week.

League co-owner Gerry Cardinale expressed satisfaction with the results, noting that the UFL was still outperforming the national telecasts of the National Hockey League and Major League Soccer, but falsely claimed ratings were "not down."

In millions of viewers

| Broadcaster | 1 | 2 | 3 | 4 | 5 | 6 | 7 | 8 | 9 | 10 | Conference finals | Championship game | Total | Average |
|---|---|---|---|---|---|---|---|---|---|---|---|---|---|---|
| ABC | – | 0.6 | 0.7 | 0.9 | – | 0.9 | 1.0 | 1.0 | 1.0 | 0.7 | 1.1 | 1.0 | 9.9 | 0.9 |
| ABC | – | – | 1.0 | – | – | – | – | – | – | – | – | – | 9.9 | 0.9 |
| ESPN | 0.6 | 0.6 | 0.3 | – | 0.6 | 0.5 | 0.2 | – | – | 0.3 | – | – | 4.5 | 0.5 |
| ESPN | 0.4 | – | – | – | 0.6 | – | – | – | – | – | – | – | 4.5 | 0.5 |
| ESPN | – | – | – | – | 0.4 | – | – | – | – | – | – | – | 4.5 | 0.5 |
| ESPN3 | – | – | – | – | – | – | – | – | 0.0 | – | – | – | 0.0 | 0.0 |
| Fox | 0.7 | 0.7 | 0.7 | 0.7 | 0.5 | 0.6 | 0.5 | 0.6 | 0.5 | 0.7 | 0.9 | – | 13.4 | 0.7 |
| Fox | 0.6 | – | – | 0.6 | – | 0.6 | 0.6 | 0.6 | 1.4 | 0.6 | – | – | 13.4 | 0.7 |
| Fox | – | – | – | 0.7 | – | – | – | 0.6 | – | – | – | – | 13.4 | 0.7 |
| FS1 | – | 0.5 | – | – | – | – | – | – | – | – | – | – | 0.5 | 0.5 |
| Total | 2.3 | 2.4 | 2.7 | 2.9 | 2.1 | 2.6 | 2.3 | 2.8 | 2.9 | 2.3 | 2.0 | 1.0 | 28.3 | |
| Average | 0.6 | 0.6 | 0.7 | 0.7 | 0.5 | 0.7 | 0.6 | 0.7 | 0.7 | 0.6 | 1.0 | 1.0 | | 0.7 |

* One decimal place is shown in table but two decimal places are used in all calculations.
* Viewership figures for games streaming on ESPN+ were not released.

=== Radio ===
The Memphis Showboats, the only UFL team to have their games broadcast on local radio in 2024, changed flagship stations to KXHT for the 2025 season, following two years on WKIM. The Houston Roughnecks resumed carrying Spanish language play-by-play via Deportes Nation, which had carried the 2020 Roughnecks.

== Reception ==
In an interview with Randy Karraker prior to the 2025 UFL Championship Game, Brandon indicated that the league had reached the point of being a going concern and that players, agents and coaches now had enough confidence in the league that it was not at risk of failure in the short term, effectively guaranteeing a 2026 UFL season. Overall television ratings and attendance went down in most markets (with the exception of the Michigan Panthers, who made substantial gains), which prompted the firings of ticket sales directors and vice presidents of business operations in Arlington, Houston and Birmingham, three of the UFL's most consistently underperforming markets. The decline in television ratings was not enough to cause alarm for league executives, who remained satisfied with the results, but did prompt reconsideration of the league's start date, which followed the USFL model of starting several weeks after the end of the NFL season (whereas the XFL traditionally drafted off the end of the NFL season and began play the weekend after the Super Bowl).

== Signees to the NFL ==
One person from the 2025 UFL season made an opening day 53-man roster for the NFL: defensive tackle Perrion Winfrey. Additionally, running back Jacob Saylors was named to a 53-man roster just prior to opening day. Nine others began the 2025 NFL season on practice squads.

Legend
| | Made an NFL team (active, practice squad or PUP) |
| **Bold** | Made the active roster |
| Italics | Made NFL Team but was later cut |

| Player | Position | UFL team | NFL team | Ref. |
|---|---|---|---|---|
| Jashaun Corbin | RB | San Antonio Brahmas | Atlanta Falcons/New England Patriots | |
| Harrison Mevis | K | Birmingham Stallions | New York Jets/Los Angeles Rams | |
| Mario Goodrich | CB | Birmingham Stallions | Denver Broncos/New York Jets | |
| Seth Green | TE | Arlington Renegades | New Orleans Saints | |
| Barry Wesley | OT | Birmingham Stallions | New Orleans Saints | |
| Damon Arnette | CB | Houston Roughnecks | Houston Texans | |
| Perrion Winfrey | DT | Birmingham Stallions | Dallas Cowboys | |
| Sal Cannella | TE | Arlington Renegades | Cleveland Browns | |
| Geor’Quarius Spivey | TE | Houston Roughnecks | Kansas City Chiefs | |
| Jayden Price | CB | Arlington Renegades | New Orleans Saints | |
| Yasir Durant | OT | DC Defenders | New England Patriots | |
| Dresser Winn | QB | Memphis Showboats | Los Angeles Rams | |
| Ryan Nelson | OT | Michigan Panthers | Los Angeles Chargers | |
| Seth Williams | WR | DC Defenders | Las Vegas Raiders | |
| Jacob Sykes | DT | San Antonio Brahmas | Philadelphia Eagles | |
| Kyon Barrs | DT | Arlington Renegades | Arizona Cardinals | |
| Samuel Jackson | OL | Houston Roughnecks | New York Jets | |
| Toa Taua | RB | Michigan Panthers | Cleveland Browns | |
| Steven Gilmore Jr. | CB | Birmingham Stallions | Arizona Cardinals | |
| Deon Cain | WR | Birmingham Stallions | Buffalo Bills | |
| **Nick Whiteside** | CB | St. Louis Battlehawks | Detroit Lions | |
| Keni-H Lovely | CB | Michigan Panthers | Arizona Cardinals/Jacksonville Jaguars | |
| R.J. Moten | LB | Michigan Panthers | New England Patriots | |
| Liam Fornadel | OL | DC Defenders | New York Jets | |
| **Jacob Saylors** | RB | St. Louis Battlehawks | Detroit Lions | |
| Jaylon Allen | DE | Memphis Showboats | San Francisco 49ers | |
| Alec Lindstrom | C | Memphis Showboats | New England Patriots | |
| Kwamie Lassiter II | WR | Memphis Showboats | Kansas City Chiefs | |
| Henry Black | S | San Antonio Brahmas | Atlanta Falcons | |
| Garrett Nelson | DE | San Antonio Brahmas | Denver Broncos/New Orleans Saints | |
| Kyler Baugh | DT | St. Louis Battlehawks | Pittsburgh Steelers | |
| Keenan Isaac | CB | Houston Roughnecks | Cleveland Browns | |
| Ricky Lee | OT | Arlington Renegades | Jacksonville Jaguars | |
| Braylon Sanders | WR | DC Defenders | Washington Commanders | |
| Jacob Harris | WR | San Antonio Brahmas | Tampa Bay Buccaneers | |
| Josiah Bronson | DL | Memphis Showboats | Tennessee Titans | |
| Bradlee Anae | DE | Birmingham Stallions | San Francisco 49ers | |
| D.J. Miller Jr | CB | Michigan Panthers | Detroit Lions | |
| Thomas Gordon | TE | San Antonio Brahmas | Chicago Bears | |
| Steven Stilianos | TE | San Antonio Brahmas | Detroit Lions | |
| Deon Jackson | RB | DC Defenders | Detroit Lions | |
| Deneric Prince | RB | Memphis Showboats | New England Patriots | |
| Gunnar Oakes | TE | Michigan Panthers | Detroit Lions | |
| Keaton Sutherland | OG | Birmingham Stallions | Detroit Lions | |
| Gunner Britton | OL | DC Defenders | Detroit Lions | |
| Mike Panasiuk | C | St. Louis Battlehawks | New Orleans Saints | |
| Malik Turner | WR | Michigan Panthers | San Francisco 49ers | |
| Mekhi Garner | CB | Arlington Renegades | Chicago Bears | |
| Kawaan Baker | WR | San Antonio Brahmas | Las Vegas Raiders/Green Bay Packers | |
| Marcus Haynes | DE | San Antonio Brahmas | Indianapolis Colts | |
| Nehemiah Shelton | CB | Memphis Showboats | Los Angeles Chargers | |
| Nelson Ceaser | DE | San Antonio Brahmas | Buffalo Bills | |
| Micah Abraham | CB | St. Louis Battlehawks | Denver Broncos | |
| Shakel Brown | DT | Houston Roughnecks | San Francisco 49ers | |
| Bryce Perkins | QB | Michigan Panthers | Carolina Panthers | |
| Ronnie Perkins | DE | Birmingham Stallions | Atlanta Falcons | |
| Michael Ojemudia | CB | DC Defenders | Dallas Cowboys | |
| Mason Brooks | OT | DC Defenders | Miami Dolphins | |
| Kenny Willekes | DE | Michigan Panthers | Pittsburgh Steelers | |
| Cornell Powell | WR | DC Defenders | Houston Texans/Pittsburgh Steelers | |
| Jarveon Howard | RB | St. Louis Battlehawks | Buffalo Bills | |
| Cameron Dantzler | CB | Memphis Showboats | Miami Dolphins | |
| Dohnovan West | OL | St. Louis Battlehawks | Arizona Cardinals | |
| Marvin Moody | LB | Houston Roughnecks | Cleveland Browns | |
| Charlie Thomas | LB | Arlington Renegades | Cleveland Browns | |
| Lucas Havrisik | K | Arlington Renegades | Green Bay Packers | |
| Peter Bowden | LS | Michigan Panthers | Los Angeles Chargers | |
