= 2024 UFL draft =

American football events to select players

General information
- Date: July 17, 2024
- Time: 10:00 a.m.
- Location: Social media

Overview
- 80 total selections in 10 rounds
- League: United Football League
- First selection: Jason Bean (QB); Memphis Showboats

The 2024 UFL draft, also known as the 2024 UFL college draft, was the first meeting of United Football League (UFL) franchises to select newly eligible players ahead of the 2025 UFL season. It was the first rookie draft since the league formed from the merger of the United States Football League (USFL) and XFL. Previously, the two predecessor leagues held separate rookie drafts in 2023 prior to the merger and then a dispersal draft in 2024 following the merger and contraction from 16 total pre-merger teams to the 8 teams that competed in the 2024 season. The draft was held on July 17, 2024 and was announced only six days prior. The announcement of the draft also coincided with the beginning a series of player showcase combines held by the league that would continue to be held though October 2024 after the draft but before the start of the 2025 season.

== Draft order ==
Draft order was based on a team's record and result from the 2024 UFL season. However, under UFL rules meant to prevent against tanking, Memphis received the first round pick by defeating Houston in the last week of the 2024 season.

Selection Number	Team	2024 record	Playoff result
1	Memphis Showboats	2–8	Did not qualify
2	Houston Roughnecks	1–9	Did not qualify
3	Arlington Renegades	3–7	Did not qualify
4	DC Defenders	4–6	Did not qualify
5	St. Louis Battlehawks	7–3	Div championship
6	Michigan Panthers	7–3	Div championship
7	San Antonio Brahmas	7–3	Lost championship
8	Birmingham Stallions	9–1	Won championship

== Player selections ==
Players eligible for the 2024 UFL draft were those who were also eligible for the 2024 NFL draft but went undrafted.

Rnd	Pick No.	Team	Player	Pos.	College
1	1	Memphis Showboats	Jason Bean	QB	Kansas
1	2	Houston Roughnecks	Eyabi Okie	DE	Charlotte
1	3	Arlington Renegades	John Rhys Plumlee	QB	UCF
1	4	DC Defenders	Gottlieb Ayedze	OT	Maryland
1	5	St. Louis Battlehawks	Chevan Cordeiro	QB	San José State
1	6	Michigan Panthers	Julian Pearl	OT	Illinois
1	7	San Antonio Brahmas	Gabe Hall	DT	Baylor
1	8	Birmingham Stallions	Frank Crum	OT	Wyoming
2	9	Memphis Showboats	Blake Watson	RB	Memphis
2	10	Houston Roughnecks	Tra Fluellen	S	Middle Tennessee
2	11	Arlington Renegades	Griffin McDowell	OT	Chattanooga
2	12	DC Defenders	Kedon Slovis	QB	BYU
2	13	St. Louis Battlehawks	Cody Schrader	RB	Missouri
2	14	Michigan Panthers	Dwight McGlothern	CB	Arkansas
2	15	San Antonio Brahmas	Gabriel Murphy	DE	UCLA
2	16	Birmingham Stallions	Lorenzo Thompson	OT	Rhode Island
3	17	Memphis Showboats	Evan Anderson	NT	Florida Atlantic
3	18	Houston Roughnecks	Kameron Stutts	OG	Auburn
3	19	Arlington Renegades	Kalen DeLoach	LB	Florida State
3	20	DC Defenders	Leonard Taylor III	DT	Miami (FL)
3	21	St. Louis Battlehawks	Pheldarius Payne	DE	Virginia Tech
3	22	Michigan Panthers	Isaac Ukwu	DE	Ole Miss
3	23	San Antonio Brahmas	Donovan Jennings	OT	South Florida
3	24	Birmingham Stallions	Emani Bailey	RB	TCU
4	25	Memphis Showboats	Jalen Coker	WR	Holy Cross
4	26	Houston Roughnecks	Donovan Manuel	LB	FIU
4	27	Arlington Renegades	Popo Aumavae	NT	Oregon
4	28	DC Defenders	Garret Greenfield	OT	South Dakota State
4	29	St. Louis Battlehawks	Bradley Ashmore	OT	Vanderbilt
4	30	Michigan Panthers	Brian Dooley	OT	Eastern Michigan
4	31	San Antonio Brahmas	Miles Battle	CB	Utah
4	32	Birmingham Stallions	Isaiah Williams	WR	Illinois
5	33	Memphis Showboats	Eric Watts	DE	UConn
5	34	Houston Roughnecks	Hayden Gillum	OL	Kansas State
5	35	Arlington Renegades	Amari Gainer	LB	North Carolina
5	36	DC Defenders	Braiden McGregor	DE	Michigan
5	37	St. Louis Battlehawks	Carl Jones Jr.	LB	UCLA
5	38	Michigan Panthers	Rocky Lombardi	QB	Northern Illinois
5	39	San Antonio Brahmas	Jamree Kromah	DE	James Madison
5	40	Birmingham Stallions	Dallin Holker	TE	Colorado State
6	41	Memphis Showboats	Andrew Raym	C	Oklahoma
6	42	Houston Roughnecks	Malcolm Epps	TE	Pittsburgh
6	43	Arlington Renegades	Bo Richter	DE	Air Force
6	44	DC Defenders	Michael Wiley	RB	Arizona
6	45	St. Louis Battlehawks	Isaiah Coe	DT	Oklahoma
6	46	Michigan Panthers	Dayton Wade	WR	Ole Miss
6	47	San Antonio Brahmas	Lideatrick Griffin	WR	Mississippi State
6	48	Birmingham Stallions	Trajan Jeffcoat	DE	Arkansas
7	49	Memphis Showboats	Yvandy Rigby	LB	Temple
7	50	Houston Roughnecks	Xavier Benson	LB	Oklahoma State
7	51	Arlington Renegades	Taki Taimani	DT	Oregon
7	52	DC Defenders	Dallas Gant	LB	Toledo
7	53	St. Louis Battlehawks	Jelani Baker	WR	Limestone
7	54	Michigan Panthers	Akeem Dent	S	Florida State
7	55	San Antonio Brahmas	Beau Brade	S	Maryland
7	56	Birmingham Stallions	Andrew Coker	OT	TCU
8	57	Memphis Showboats	Ja'Quan Sheppard	CB	Maryland
8	58	Houston Roughnecks	Rayshad Williams	CB	Texas Tech
8	59	Arlington Renegades	Spencer Rolland	OT	North Carolina
8	60	DC Defenders	Curtis Jacobs	LB	Penn State
8	61	St. Louis Battlehawks	Jadon Janke	WR	South Dakota State
8	62	Michigan Panthers	Andrew Meyer	C	UTEP
8	63	San Antonio Brahmas	Sincere Haynesworth	C	Tulane
8	64	Birmingham Stallions	Ahmarean Brown	WR	South Carolina
9	65	Memphis Showboats	McCallan Castles	TE	Tennessee
9	66	Houston Roughnecks	Malik Dunlap	CB	Texas Tech
9	67	Arlington Renegades	Briason Mays	C	Southern Miss
9	68	DC Defenders	Tanner Mordecai	QB	Wisconsin
9	69	St. Louis Battlehawks	Myles Sims	CB	Georgia Tech
9	70	Michigan Panthers	J. D. Duplain	OL	Michigan State
9	71	San Antonio Brahmas	D. J. Miller Jr.	CB	Kent State
9	72	Birmingham Stallions	Sam Hartman	QB	Notre Dame
10	73	Memphis Showboats	Mason Tipton	WR	Yale
10	74	Houston Roughnecks	Geor'Quarius Spivey	TE	Mississippi State
10	75	Arlington Renegades	Drake Stoops	WR	Oklahoma
10	76	DC Defenders	Omar Brown	S	Nebraska
10	77	St. Louis Battlehawks	Myles Jones	CB	Duke
10	78	Michigan Panthers	Isaiah Stalbird	S	South Dakota State
10	79	San Antonio Brahmas	Joshua Cephus	WR	UTSA
10	80	Birmingham Stallions	Ethan Driskell	OT	Marshall
