= Houston football =

Houston football may refer to:

- Houston Cougars football, college football team in Houston, Texas
- Houston Texans, National Football League franchise in Houston, Texas
- Houston Oilers, former NFL team that is now the Tennessee Titans
- Houston Gamblers, United States Football League team in Houston, Texas
  - Houston Gamblers (2022)
- Houston Roughnecks, XFL franchise based in Houston, Texas
  - Houston Roughnecks (2024)
- Sam Houston Bearcats football, college football team in Huntsville, Texas
- Houston Dynamo FC, association football club in Houston, Texas
