= Houston Gamblers (UFL) =

Football team in Houston, Texas

Logo	Wordmark
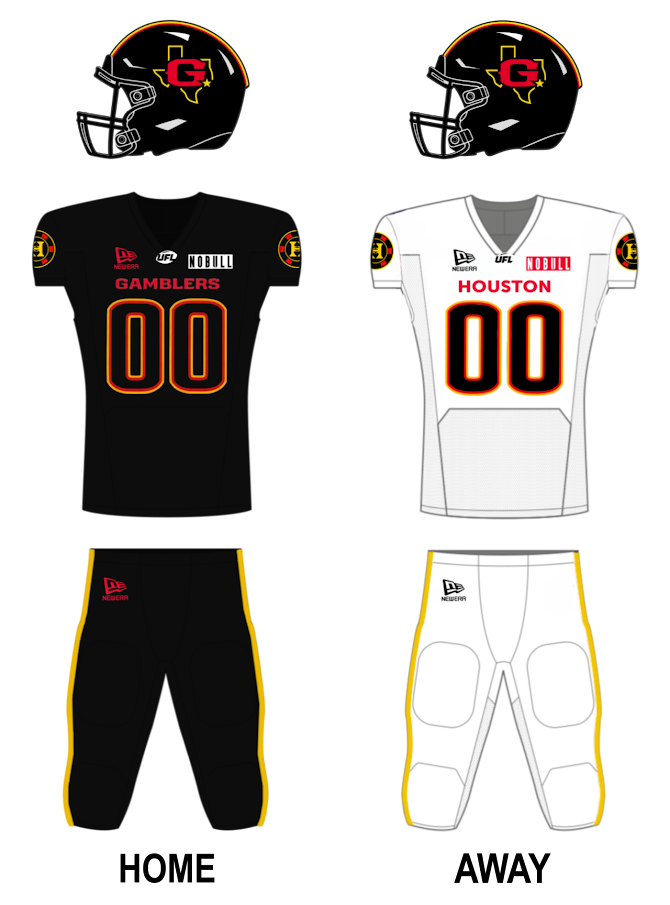
- Uniforms

General information
- Founded: November 22, 2021; 4 years ago
- Folded: 2026
- Stadium: Shell Energy Stadium; Houston, Texas
- Colors: Black, red, yellow
- Mascot: Ace the Armadillo
- Website: www.theufl.com/teams/houston

Personnel
- Owner: League owned

Team history
- Houston Gamblers (2022–2023; 2026); Houston Roughnecks (2024–2025)

Home fields
- Protective Stadium/Legion Field (2022); Simmons Bank Liberty Stadium (2023); Rice Stadium (2024); TDECU Stadium (2025); Shell Energy Stadium (2026)

League / conference affiliations
- United States Football League (2022–2023): South Division (2022–2023); United Football League (2024–2026): USFL Conference (2024–2025)

The Houston Gamblers were a professional American football team based in Houston. The Gamblers competed in the United Football League (UFL). The team was owned and operated by Dwayne Johnson's Alpha Acquico and Fox Corporation.

The team was a founding member of the USFL, as the Houston Gamblers in 2022, named after the 1980s USFL team of the same name. Though named after the city of Houston, the 2020s Gamblers never played there under that brand, instead playing its home games as the guest of other USFL teams in Birmingham, Alabama in 2022 and Memphis, Tennessee in 2023. When the USFL and XFL merged to form the UFL in 2024, the Gamblers took over the branding of the original Houston Roughnecks that had played the 2023 season in the XFL and played in Houston at Rice Stadium. The team played at TDECU Stadium (the home of the 2020 and 2023 Roughnecks) during the 2025 season. The team returned to the Gamblers name ahead of the 2026 UFL season, coinciding with a move to Shell Energy Stadium, but folded after that season.

== History ==
The Gamblers' logo from 2022 to 2023.

=== Houston Gamblers (USFL, 2022–2023) ===
The Houston Gamblers were one of eight teams that were officially announced as a USFL franchise on The Herd with Colin Cowherd on November 22, 2021. On January 6, 2022, it was announced on The Herd with Colin Cowherd that former NCAA Football Head coach Kevin Sumlin was named the Head coach and General manager of the Gamblers. Houston was the only city in the USFL nominally based west of the Mississippi River and the only city that had a representative team in both professional spring football leagues, the USFL (the Gamblers) and the XFL (the Roughnecks), though the Gamblers never set foot in Houston, instead playing as a traveling team under the USFL's hub model.

On January 6, 2022, former college head coach, Kevin Sumlin was named the head coach and general manager for the Houston Gamblers. The Gamblers' first season game was on April 17, 2022, against the Michigan Panthers at Protective Stadium in Birmingham, Alabama. Kicker Nick Vogel made a 37-yard field goal in the first quarter (the first points for the franchise). The Gamblers defeated the Panthers 17–12, winning their first game in franchise history. The Gamblers lost their next seven games before winning for their final two games of the season, and failing to qualify for the USFL playoffs.

In September 2022, the Gamblers announced that Robert Morris was named their new general manager. In November 2022, the USFL announced that the Gamblers will play at Simmons Bank Liberty Stadium in Memphis, Tennessee for the 2023 season. In February, 2023, Sumlin announced his plans to join the coaching staff of the Maryland Terrapins, this led to the Gamblers hiring former New Orleans Saints assistant coach, Curtis Johnson as their new head coach.

=== Houston Roughnecks (UFL, 2024–2025) ===
The Roughnecks' logo from 2024 to 2025.

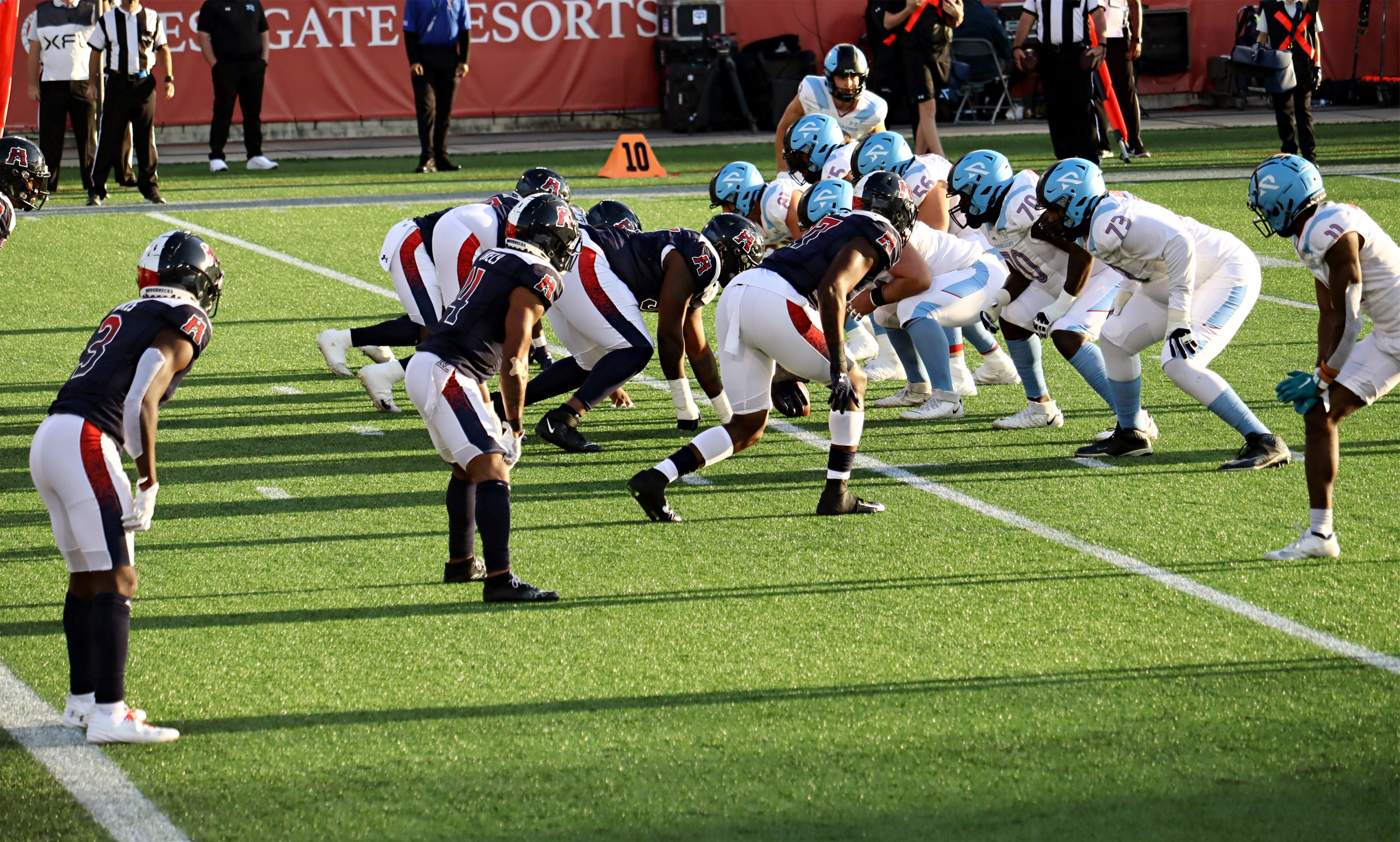
Houston Roughnecks in action against the Arlington Renegades in 2023

On January 1, as part of the merger with the XFL, the Gamblers merged with their XFL counterpart, the Roughnecks. The merged team took on the Roughnecks name and identity (including history and social media presence), while maintaining the Gamblers' coaching staff, player rights and position in the USFL Conference. The team will play in Houston as the Roughnecks did, but renovations to TDECU Stadium, the Roughnecks' home in 2020 and 2023, required the use of a different venue; Rice University Stadium was approached about the possibility prior to the merger. On February 1, 2024, the Roughnecks announced an agreement to play the 2024 season at Rice Stadium. The Roughnecks announced their return to TDECU Stadium on September 13, 2024.

By August 2025, incoming UFL co-ownership had indicated it would be moving between two and four teams, reportedly all from the USFL Conference; the Birmingham Stallions were eventually spared from relocation, and the league was "trying" to save the Michigan Panthers with a more ideal stadium, effectively guaranteeing that the Roughnecks and Memphis Showboats would be the two minimum teams relocating, one of them to Historic Crew Stadium in Columbus, Ohio. Houston was unexpectedly spared from relocation on October 3, 2025, when the league chose to relocate Memphis, Michigan and the San Antonio Brahmas.

=== Return to Gamblers identity (UFL, 2026) ===
On October 7, 2025, the UFL announced that the Roughnecks would be rebranding, returning to the Houston Gamblers name for the 2026 season. The color scheme was updated to Gamblers red and black. The UFL also announced that the team would be moving into Shell Energy Stadium in Downtown Houston.

League co-owner Mike Repole stated he chose to revert to the Gamblers name because of its "iconic" history, mentioning Pro Football Hall of Famer Jim Kelly's tenure with the 1980s incarnation of the team. Head coach Curtis Johnson was fired on November 29, 2025 in favor of bringing back the 2020s Gamblers' original head coach, Kevin Sumlin.

Following the 2026 season, the UFL announced that the Gamblers and Birmingham Stallions were folding. Repole acknowledged that in Houston's case, the instability that the merger had caused, and efforts to correct the problem by constantly changing stadiums each year, had damaged relations between Houston and the league beyond repair. On September 30, 2026, Sumlin and the Gamblers roster were summarily assigned to the Dallas Renegades, due to that teams' own roster being reassigned to Colorado.

== Culture ==
=== Mascot ===
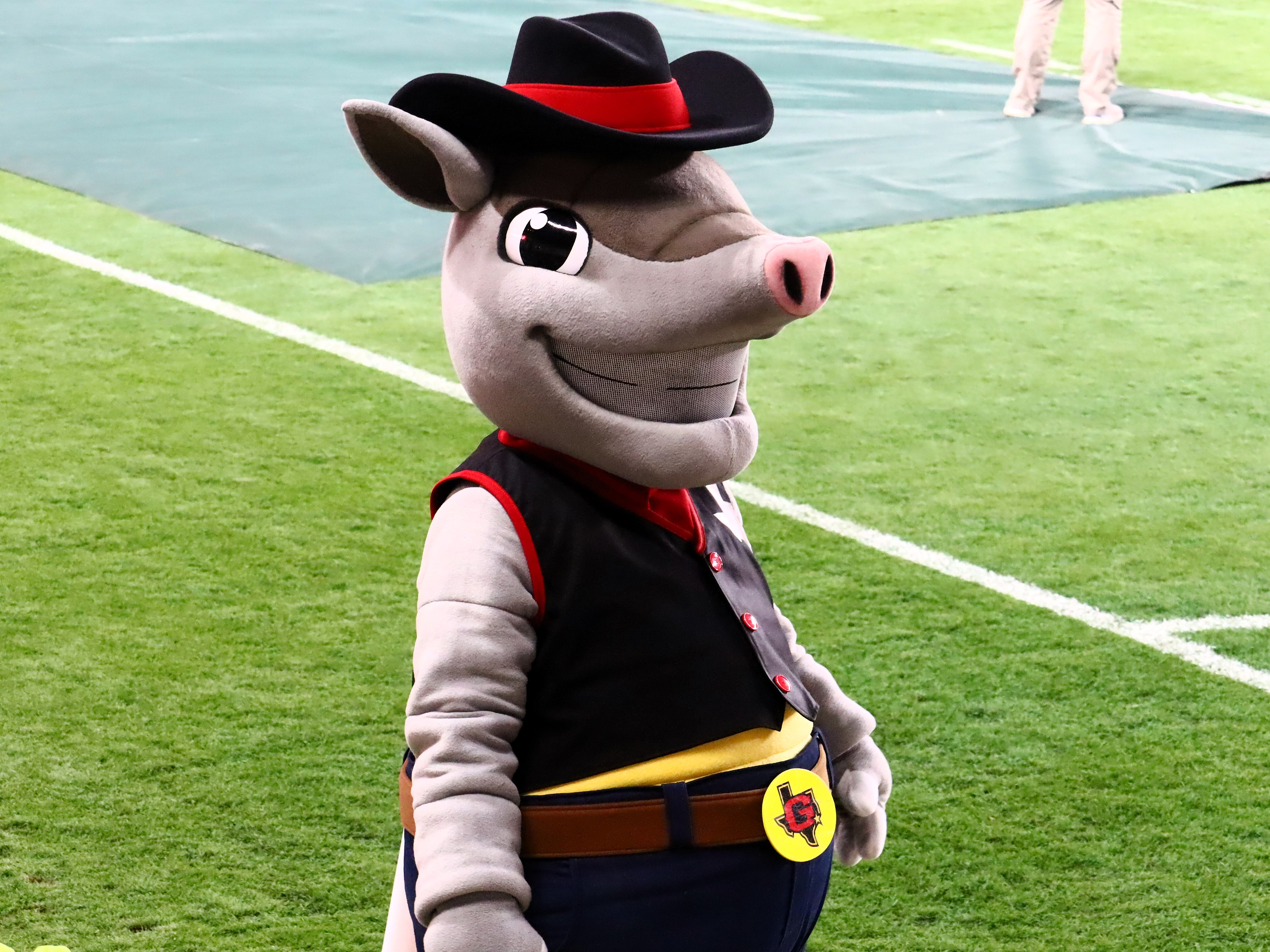
Ace the Armadillo in 2026

On April 5, 2026, Ace the Armadillo was introduced as the team's mascot following a fan vote held as part of the team's rebranding process.

== Player history ==
=== Current NFL players ===
Season	Pos	Name	NFL Team
2022	LS	Tucker Addington	Miami Dolphins
2026	S	Major Burns	Miami Dolphins
2026	WR	Kaden Davis	Chicago Bears
2026	CB	Ameer Speed	Dallas Cowboys
2026	WR	Jalen Moreno-Cropper	New Orleans Saints
2026	OT	Gottlieb Ayedze	Miami Dolphins
2026	LB	Eugene Asante	Arizona Cardinals

=== Notable players ===
Season	Pos	Name	Notes
2024	LB	Reuben Foster	Former San Francisco 49ers Linebacker, 2017 1st Round Pick
2025–2026	CB	Damon Arnette	Former Las Vegas Raiders cornerback, 2020 1st Round Pick
2026	OT	Jackson Carman	Former Cincinnati Bengals offensive tackle, 2021 2nd Round Pick

=== USFL Offensive Player of the Year award winners ===
Gamblers USFL OPOY winners
Year	Player	Position	Selector
2023	Mark Thompson	RB	USFL

=== USFL Defensive Player of the Year award winners ===
Gamblers USFL DPOY winners
Year	Player	Position	Selector
2022	Chris Odom	DE	USFL

== Coach history ==
=== Head coach history ===
#	Name	Term	Regular season				Playoffs			Awards
#	Name	Term	GC	W	L	Win %	GC	W	L	Awards
Houston Gamblers
1	Kevin Sumlin	2022	10	3	7	.300	-	-	-	
Houston Gamblers / Roughnecks
2	Curtis Johnson	2023–2025	30	11	19	.367	-	-	-	
Houston Gamblers
3	Kevin Sumlin	2026	10	4	6	.400	-	-	-	

=== Offensive Coordinator history ===
#	Name	Term	Regular season				Playoffs			Awards
#	Name	Term	GC	W	L	Win %	GC	W	L	Awards
Houston Gamblers
1	David Beaty	2022	10	3	7	.300	-	-	-	*Co Offensive Coordinator
2	J. D. Runnels	2022	10	3	7	.300	-	-	-	*Co Offensive Coordinator
Houston Gamblers / Roughnecks
3	Eric Price	2023–2026	40	15	25	.375	-	-	-	

=== Defensive Coordinator history ===
#	Name	Term	Regular season				Playoffs			Awards
#	Name	Term	GC	W	L	Win %	GC	W	L	Awards
Houston Gamblers
1	Tim Lewis	2022	10	3	7	.300	-	-	-	
Houston Gamblers / Roughnecks
2	Chris Wilson	2023–2025	30	11	19	.367	-	-	-	
Houston Gamblers
3	Marvin Sanders	2026	10	4	6	.400	-	-	-	

== Records ==
All-time Gamblers/Roughnecks leaders
Leader	Player	Record	Years with Gamblers/Roughnecks
Passing yards	Kenji Bahar	2,250 passing yards	2022–2024
Passing Touchdowns	Clayton Thorson Kenji Bahar	10 passing touchdowns	2022 2022–2024
Rushing yards	Mark Thompson	1,341 rushing yards	2022–2024
Rushing Touchdowns	Mark Thompson	21 rushing touchdowns	2022–2024
Receiving yards	Justin Hall	1,816 receiving yards	2023–2026
Receiving Touchdowns	Justin Hall	12 receiving touchdowns	2023–2026
Receptions	Justin Hall	195 receptions	2023–2026
Tackles	Jeremiah Tyler	150 tackles	2023–2025
Sacks	Chris Odom	17.5 sacks	2022, 2024
Interceptions	William Likely	4 interceptions	2022
Coaching wins	Curtis Johnson	11 wins	2023–2025

=== Starting quarterbacks ===
Regular season – As of June 2, 2026

Season(s)	Quarterback(s)	Notes	Ref
Houston Gamblers
2022	Clayton Thorson (1–6) / Kenji Bahar (2–1)		
2023	Kenji Bahar (4–5) / Terry Wilson (1–0)		
Houston Roughnecks
2024	Reid Sinnett (1–4) / Jarrett Guarantano (0–3) / Nolan Henderson (0–2)		
2025	Anthony Brown (1–2) / Nolan Henderson (0–1) / Jalan McClendon (4–2)		
Houston Gamblers
2026	Nolan Henderson (1–3) / Hunter Dekkers (2–2) / Taulia Tagovailoa (0–1) / John Rhys Plumlee (1–0)		

Most games as starting quarterback

Name	Period	GP	GS	W	L	Pct
Houston Gamblers
Kenji Bahar	2022–2023	16	12	6	6	.500
Clayton Thorson	2022	7	7	1	6	.143
Terry Wilson	2022–2023	7	1	1	0	1.000
Hunter Dekkers	2026	5	4	2	2	.500
Taulia Tagovailoa	2026	4	1	0	1	.000
John Rhys Plumlee	2026	4	1	1	0	1.000
Houston Roughnecks
Jalan McClendon	2025	7	6	4	2	.667
Reid Sinnett	2024	10	5	1	4	.200
Anthony Brown	2025	3	3	1	2	.333
Nolan Henderson	2024–2026	15	7	1	6	.143
Jarrett Guarantano	2024	5	3	0	3	.000

=== Attendance ===
Top 10 Crowds
Ranking	Attendance	Date	Score
1	9,157	March 31, 2024	Roughnecks 12, Showboats 18
2	7,744	April 5, 2026	Gamblers 22, Stallions 20
3	7,179	April 21, 2024	Roughnecks 17, Renegades 9
4	7,124	March 28, 2025	Roughnecks 6, Battlehawks 31
5	6,684	May 25, 2025	Roughnecks 24, Defenders 21
6	6,613	April 19, 2025	Roughnecks 16, Stallions 23
7	6,527	May 26, 2024	Roughnecks 22, Panther 26
8	6,285	April 27, 2024	Roughnecks 9. Stallions 32
9	6,217	May 24, 2026	Gamblers 15, Battlehawks 21
10	6,134	May 12, 2024	Roughnecks 12, Brahmas 15

=== Year by year ===
Season	Head Coach	Avg. Crowd	Largest Crowd	Home Record
2024	Curtis Johnson	7,056	9,157	1–4
2025	Curtis Johnson	5,712	7,124	2-3
2026	Kevin Sumlin	5,683	7,744	2-3

== Statistics and records ==
=== Season-by-season record ===
UFL champions^{†} (2024–present)	USFL champions^{§} (2022–2023)	Conference champions^{*}	Division champions^{^}	Wild Card berth^{#}

Season	Team	League	Conference	Division	Regular season			Postseason results	Awards	Head coaches	Pct.
Season	Team	League	Conference	Division	Finish	W	L	Postseason results	Awards	Head coaches	Pct.
2022	2022	USFL	—N/a	South	4th	3	7		Chris Odom (DPOY)	Kevin Sumlin	.300
2023	2023	USFL	—N/a	South	3rd	5	5		Mark Thompson (OPOY)	Curtis Johnson	.500
2024	2024	UFL	USFL	—N/a	4th	1	9			Curtis Johnson	.100
2025	2025	UFL	USFL	—N/a	3rd	5	5			Curtis Johnson	.500
2026	2026	UFL	—N/a	—N/a	T–5th	4	6			Kevin Sumlin	.400
Total						18	32	All-time regular season record (2022–2026)			.360
Total						0	0	All-time postseason record (2022–2026)			–
Total						18	32	All-time regular season and postseason record (2022–2026)			.360

=== Rivalries ===
==== Double Down Derby ====
The Houston Gamblers have shared a rivalry with the Birmingham Stallions since 2022. This rivalry was called the Double Down Derby. As of 2026, the Gamblers hold a 4–6 record against the Stallions.

==== Memphis Showboats ====
The Houston Gamblers / Roughnecks shared Simmons Bank Liberty Stadium in Memphis, Tennessee with the Memphis Showboats during the 2023 season. In 2024, the two teams played against each other in the season finale for the number one overall pick in the 2024 UFL draft. The winner would get the number one pick, the Showboats won the game 19–12 and earned the 2025 number one pick. The series record is tied at 3–3.

==== Franchise matchup history ====
Team	Record	Pct.
Birmingham Stallions	4–6	.400
Columbus Aviators	1–1	.500
Dallas Renegades	1–2	.333
DC Defenders	1–2	.333
Louisville Kings	0–1	.000
Memphis Showboats	3–3	.500
Michigan Panthers	2–4	.333
New Jersey Generals	1–1	.500
New Orleans Breakers	1–3	.250
Orlando Storm	0–1	.000
Pittsburgh Maulers	1–1	.500
Philadelphia Stars	1–1	.500
San Antonio Brahmas	1–1	.500
St. Louis Battlehawks	1–3	.250
Tampa Bay Bandits	0–2	.000

- Defunct teams in light gray.
