= XFL Championship =

American football conference championship game

The XFL championship game, played first in 2023, decided the league champion of the XFL at the end of its season. After the 2024 merger of the XFL and the USFL into the United Football League (UFL), with the XFL becoming the XFL Conference of the UFL, the game became the XFL Conference championship.

The XFL championship was awarded to one of the league's home stadiums several months in advance, following the lead of other professional championships such as the Super Bowl and Grey Cup; the UFL has continued that strategy, as opposed to its merger partner the USFL, which held its playoffs at a neutral site. As a conference championship, the game was held at the home stadium of the team with the best regular season record in the XFL Conference.

The XFL was dissolved October 7, 2025 as the UFL moved toward a unified scheduling strategy.

== List of games ==
Every winning team in bold.

Season	Winning team	Score	Losing team	Location	Stadium
2020	Canceled amid the **COVID-19 pandemic**			Houston, Texas	TDECU Stadium
2023	**Arlington Renegades** (1)	**35**–26	DC Defenders	San Antonio, Texas	Alamodome
2024	**San Antonio Brahmas** (1)	**25**–15	St. Louis Battlehawks	St. Louis, Missouri	The Dome at America's Center
2025	**DC Defenders** (1)	**36**–18	St. Louis Battlehawks	St. Louis, Missouri	The Dome at America's Center

== Appearances by year ==
In the sortable table below, teams are ordered first by number of appearances, then by number of wins, and finally by year of first appearance. In the "Season(s)" column, bold years indicate winning Championship Games. Teams marked in gray are now defunct.

Apps	Team	Wins	Losses	Win %	Game(s)
1	Arlington Renegades	1	0	1.000	**2023**
1	San Antonio Brahmas	1	0	1.000	**2024**
2	DC Defenders	1	1	.500	2023, **2025**
2	St. Louis Battlehawks	0	2	.000	2024, 2025

== See also ==
- United Bowl
- USFL Championship Game
