= Curtis Johnson (American football coach) =

American football coach (born 1961)

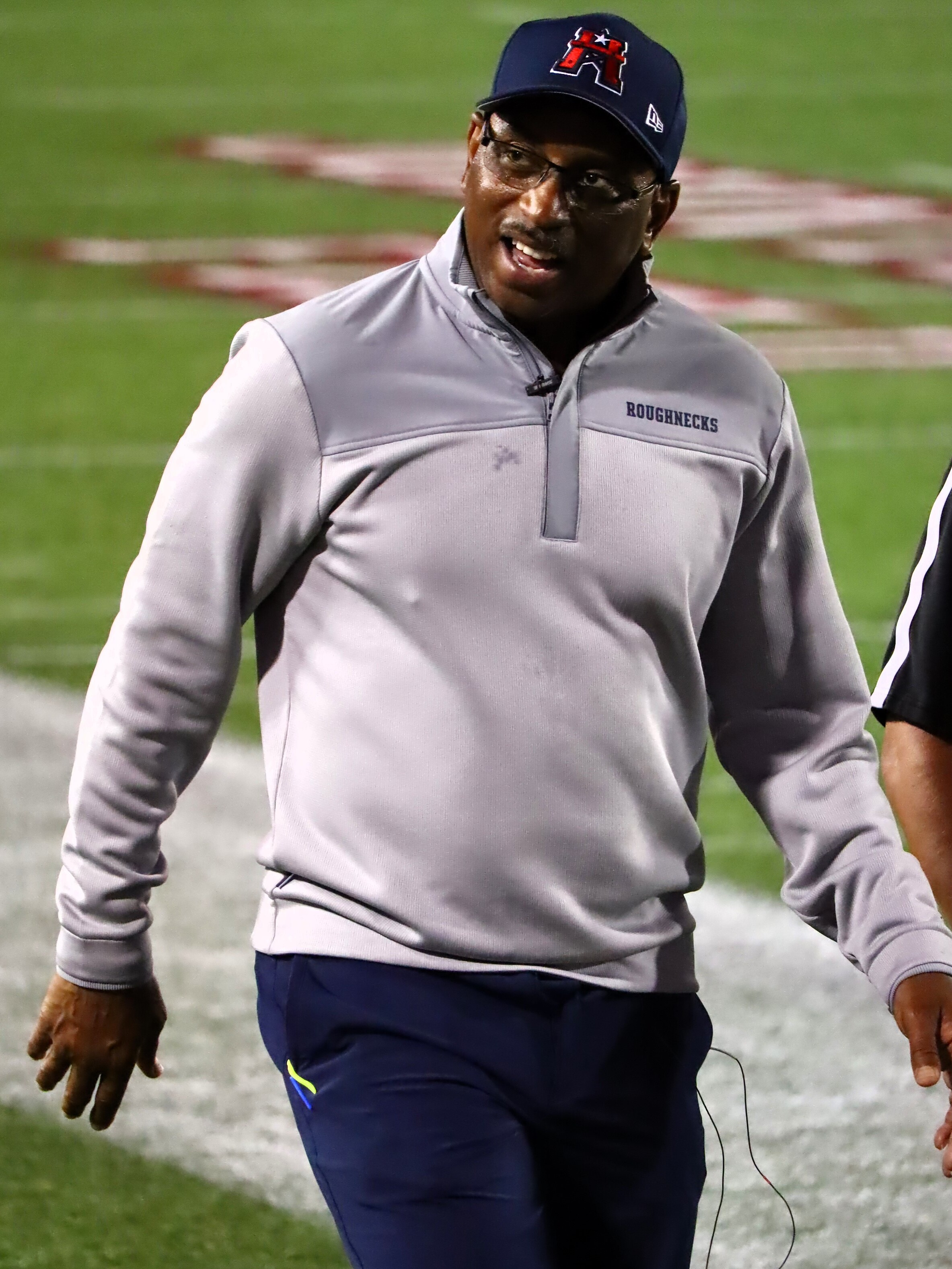
- Johnson with the Houston Roughnecks in 2025

Southern Jaguars
- Title: Associate head coach & wide receivers coach

Personal information
- Born: November 5, 1961 (age 65); New Orleans, Louisiana, U.S.

Career information
- High school: Laplace (LA) St. Charles
- College: Idaho

Career history
- Lewiston (ID) HS (1984–1986) Wide receivers coach; Idaho (1987–1988) Wide receivers coach; San Diego State (1989–1993) Wide receivers coach; SMU (1994) Wide receivers coach; California (1995) Wide receivers coach; Miami (FL) (1996–2005) Wide receivers coach; New Orleans Saints (2006–2011) Wide receivers coach; Tulane (2012–2015) Head coach; Chicago Bears (2016) Wide receivers coach; New Orleans Saints (2017–2020) Senior offensive assistant; New Orleans Saints (2021) Senior offensive assistant & wide receivers coach; Houston Roughnecks / Gamblers (2023–2025) Head coach; Southern (2026–present) Associate head coach & wide receivers coach

Awards and highlights
- National champion (2001); Super Bowl champion (XLIV)

Head coaching record
- Regular season: NCAA: 15–33 (.313); USFL/UFL: 9–17 (.346)
- Postseason: NCAA: 0–1 (.000)
- Career: NCAA: 15–34 (.306); USFL/UFL: 9–17 (.346)

Curtis "C.J." Johnson, Jr. (born November 5, 1961) is an American football coach. He was the head coach at Tulane University from 2012 to 2015 and for the Houston Gamblers and Roughnecks from 2023 to 2025. He is currently a senior advisor to Southern University's football program.

== Coaching career ==
=== Early years ===
After graduating from the University of Idaho, Johnson first became a wide receivers coach at Lewiston High School in Lewiston, Idaho before taking his first college assistant job for Idaho in 1987. In the series of assistant jobs that followed, Johnson developed a reputation as an outstanding recruiter as well as position coach. At San Diego State, he recruited future Pro Football Hall of Fame running back Marshall Faulk (like him, a native New Orleanian), as well as wide receiver Darnay Scott. At SDSU, he also coached alongside Sean Payton, then the team's running backs coach, who would later offer Johnson his first NFL job with the New Orleans Saints.

After San Diego State, Johnson spent single seasons at Southern Methodist University, and at the University of California (where he coached future All-American Bobby Shaw, among others), before taking a position at Miami in 1996.

=== Miami ===
Johnson spent the next decade at Miami. As part of a staff that went to nine bowl games and won the 2001 National Championship, Johnson coached Andre Johnson, Santana Moss, and Reggie Wayne. He was also credited with recruiting standout safety Ed Reed, another native New Orleanian.

=== New Orleans Saints ===
Johnson was a member of Sean Payton's original Saints coaching staff. In his time there, he coached wide receivers Marques Colston, Devery Henderson, Robert Meachem, and Lance Moore, among others. From 2006–11, his wideouts combined for 108 touchdown grabs and 35 performances with over 100 yards receiving. He was part of the coaching staff for the team that won Super Bowl XLIV in the 2009 season.

=== Tulane ===
On December 5, 2011, Johnson was named the new head coach of the Tulane Green Wave football team, replacing outgoing coach Bob Toledo. Johnson finished the NFL season with the Saints while simultaneously taking over the program at Tulane.

On November 28, 2015, Johnson was relieved of his duties as Tulane's head coach. After beginning the 2013 season 6–2, Johnson would go on to lose 22 of his final 27 games against Football Bowl Subdivision opponents. He finished at Tulane with a 15–34 record through four full seasons. He compiled a 7–9 conference record in the C-USA (2012 and 2013), and a 3–13 conference record in the American Athletic Conference (2014 and 2015).

Upon Johnson's dismissal, Tulane Athletic Director Rick Dickson said "I want to thank CJ for his hard work and his dedication to rebuilding the Green Wave football program. His efforts were rewarded in 2013 when Tulane reached its first bowl in 11 years. Since then, however, the program has not progressed to the level that we aspire to."

=== Chicago Bears ===
On February 15, 2016, Johnson was hired by the Bears as wide receivers coach to replace Mike Groh, who left for the same position with the Los Angeles Rams. After the season, he turned down an offer to remain with the Bears and left the team on January 30, 2017.

=== New Orleans Saints ===
He rejoined the Saints in 2017 as a senior offensive assistant and in 2021 added the additional title of wide receivers coach.

=== Houston Gamblers ===
On February 15, 2023, Johnson was hired by the Houston Gamblers of the United States Football League (USFL) as their next head coach for the 2023 season. The Gamblers had a rough 0–2 start, but won 4 straight to be the No. 1 team in the USFL. Unfortunately for Johnson, the Gamblers lost 3 of 4 to finish 5–5, missing the playoffs.

=== Houston Roughnecks ===
Johnson and all other Houston Gamblers players and coaches were all transferred to the Houston Roughnecks after it was announced that the Gamblers took on the identity of their XFL counterpart, the Roughnecks. It has been frequently rumored that Daryl Johnston, current UFL Vice President, insisted on keeping Johnson as head coach of the Houston UFL team despite his poor coaching record.

The Roughnecks finished the 2024 season with a 1–9 record, the worst in the UFL, tying the 2022 Pittsburgh Maulers for the worst record in the history of spring football. The team recovered midway through the 2025 season to finish 5–5. Johnson was fired November 29, 2025.

=== Southern University ===
Johnson was hired by the Southern Jaguars football squad on December 17, 2025, serving as a senior advisor to head coach Marshall Faulk.

== Personal life ==
Johnson was born in New Orleans and grew up in St. Rose, Louisiana, where his father was a St. Charles Parish councilman. He attended St. Charles Catholic High School in LaPlace, Louisiana. He was honored by his high school's community with an exhibit hosted by the St. Charles Museum and Historical Association and the River Road Historical Society in 2010. After high school, at the University of Idaho, Johnson played college football, ran track and field, and graduated with a Bachelor of Science in Physical Education. He and his wife Angel live in Harvey and have six children. Johnson is a deacon at his church, and has travelled to schools and camps promoting academic success, hard work and faith.

One of his sons, Curtis "Trey" Johnson III played wide receiver for the University of Memphis.

== Head coaching record ==
=== College ===
| Year | Team | Overall | Conference | Standing | Bowl/playoffs |
|---|---|---|---|---|---|
Tulane Green Wave (Conference USA) (2012–2013)
| 2012 | Tulane | 2–10 | 2–6 | 6th (West) | |
| 2013 | Tulane | 7–6 | 5–3 | 4th (West) | L New Orleans |
Tulane Green Wave (American Athletic Conference) (2014–2015)
| 2014 | Tulane | 3–9 | 2–6 | T–8th | |
| 2015 | Tulane | 3–9 | 1–7 | 6th (West) | |
| Tulane: | | 15–34 | 11–22 | | |
| Total: | | 15–34 | | | |

=== USFL/UFL ===
| Team | Year | Regular Season | | | | | Postseason | | | |
| Team | Year | Won | Lost | Ties | Win % | Finish | Won | Lost | Win % | Result |
|---|---|---|---|---|---|---|---|---|---|---|
| HOU | 2023 | 5 | 5 | 0 | .500 | 3rd in USFL South | – | – | – | |
| HOU | 2024 | 1 | 9 | 0 | .100 | 4th in USFL Conference | – | – | – | |
| HOU | 2025 | 5 | 5 | 0 | .500 | 3rd in USFL Conference | – | – | – | |
| Total | | 11 | 19 | 0 | .367 | | — | — | — | — |
