= 2025 Arlington Renegades season =

American professional football season

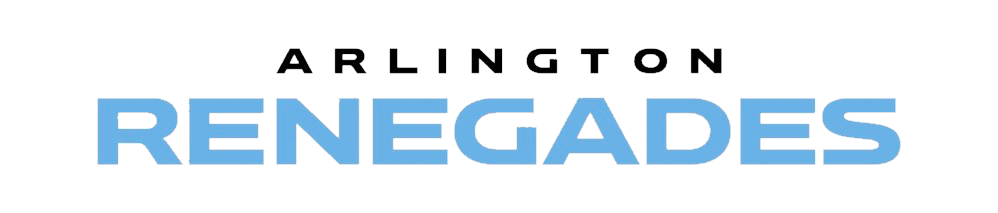
- Owner: Alpha Acquico, LLC
- General manager: Rick Mueller
- Head coach: Bob Stoops
- Home stadium: Choctaw Stadium

Results
- Record: 5–5
- Conference place: 3rd in XFL Conference
- Playoffs: Did not qualify

Uniform

The 2025 Arlington Renegades season was the fourth season for the Arlington Renegades as a professional American football franchise and the second season in the United Football League (UFL). The Renegades played their home games at Choctaw Stadium and were led by head coach Bob Stoops.

The Renegades started the season 3–1 before entering a four game losing streak, which saw them get swept by the eventual UFL champions, the DC Defenders. In week eight against the Defenders, quarterback Luis Perez had the Renegades at the Defenders 33-yard line with under ten seconds remaining trailing by three points. Instead of spiking the football to stop the clock, Perez faked the spike and was intercepted by cornerback Deandre Baker. The loss eliminated the Renegades from postseason contention, and Perez was heavily scrutinized for his decision making. Stoops said "I thought we were just spiking the football and going to kick the field goal". Stoops kept Perez as the starter for the final two games of the season in which the Renegades were victorious. Perez also won Offensive Player of the Week honors in week ten.

The Renegades finished the season 5–5, a two game improvement from the 2024 season. Perez led the league in four passing categories (attempts, completions, completion percentage and yards). Cornerback Ajene Harris led the league with three interceptions and was named Defensive Player of the Week in weeks four and five. Linebacker Donald Payne led the Renegades with 67 total tackles and was named Defensive Player of the Week in week nine. Kicker Lucas Havrisik led the league with 22 field goals made. Punter Marquette King was named Special team Player of the Week in week two.

The Renegades were one of the few teams to use the wishbone and T formation regularly. Backup Quarterback Holton Ahlers, made eight appearances on the season and was the signal caller for these formations. In week one against the San Antonio Brahmas, running back De'Veon Smith had three 1-yard touchdowns using these formations.

== Offseason ==
Shortly before the start of the 2025 season, the Renegades announced that the team's logo from its inaugural season as the Dallas Renegades, a stylized masked bandit head, would return as its primary logo and helmet decal. The bandit, named "Billy the Bandit" as part of the introduction of a mascot for the team, replaces the D-R ligature that had adorned the helmets in 2023 and 2024.

== Roster ==
2025 Arlington Renegades final roster
Quarterbacks: 15 Holton Ahlers; 10 Luke Lehnen; 12 Luis Perez; Running backs: 17 Dae Dae Hunter; 6 Tony Jones Jr.; 9 De'Veon Smith; Wide receivers: 21 Deontay Burnett; 3 JaVonta Payton; 81 Damon Sheehy-Guiseppi; 8 Tyler Vaughns; 11 LuJuan Winningham; 14 Isaiah Winstead; Tight ends: 80 Sal Cannella; 87 Seth Green; 86 Curtis Hodges	Offensive linemen: 75 Alex Akingbulu G/T; 53 J. D. DiRenzo T; 71 Matt Farniok C; 66 Jacob Johanning C; 63 Ricky Lee T; 55 Garrett McGhin G; 65 Marcus Minor G; 72 Spencer Rolland T; Defensive linemen: 92 Kyon Barrs NT; 95 Amani Bledsoe DE; 56 Jerrod Clark NT; 45 Will Clarke DE; 91 Ikenna Enechukwu DE; 44 Durrell Johnson DE; 93 Chris Odom DE; 97 La'Ron Stokes DE	Linebackers: 33 Taco Charlton OLB; 19 Kalen DeLoach MLB; 40 Caleb Johnson OLB; 18 Donald Payne MLB; 50 Willie Taylor III OLB; 25 Charlie Thomas OLB; Defensive backs: 24 Nico Bolden SS; 22 Jamal Carter FS; 2 Chris Claybrooks CB; 46 Myles Dorn SS; 5 Ajene Harris CB; 37 Carlton Johnson CB; 28 Steven Jones Jr. CB; 1 Joe Powell FS; 23 Jayden Price CB; 20 Jamar Summers CB; Special teams: 37 Jonathan Garibay K; 7 Marquette King P; 49 Antonio Ortiz LS	Reserve lists: 4 Kalen Ballage RB (IR); 27 Devin Darrington RB Retired; 59 Adrian Ealy T (IR); -- Ethan Greenidge T Retired; -- Lindsey Scott Jr. QB Retired; 51 Tuzar Skipper OLB (IR); 50 active, 6 inactive

== Staff ==
Arlington Renegades staff
Front office: Director of team operations – Matt McMillen; General manager – Rick Mueller; Head coach: Head coach – Bob Stoops; Offensive coaches: Offensive Coordinator/quarterbacks – Chuck Long; Running backs/tight ends – Reggie Davis; Offensive Line – Jonathan Himebauch	Defensive coaches: Defensive Line – Jay Hayes; Linebackers – Tommy Thigpen; Cornerbacks – Marvin Sanders; Special Teams – Scott Spurrier; Team operations: Defensive Quality Control – Spencer Duncan; Equipment Manager – Blake Kuenzi; Video Manager – Chris Crooks

== Schedule ==
All times Central

Week	Day	Date	Kickoff	TV	Opponent	Results		Location	Attendance
Week	Day	Date	Kickoff	TV	Opponent	Score	Record	Location	Attendance
1	Saturday	March 29	3:00 p.m.	Fox	San Antonio Brahmas	W 33–9	1–0	Choctaw Stadium	10,114
2	Sunday	April 6	11:00 a.m.	ESPN	Houston Roughnecks	W 11–9	2–0	Choctaw Stadium	9,582
3	Friday	April 11	7:00 p.m.	Fox	at Birmingham Stallions	L 9–10	2–1	Protective Stadium	10,126
4	Saturday	April 19	11:30 a.m.	ABC	St. Louis Battlehawks	W 30–15	3–1	Choctaw Stadium	9,614
5	Sunday	April 27	11:00 a.m.	ESPN	DC Defenders	L 33–37	3–2	Choctaw Stadium	9,544
6	Friday	May 2	7:00 p.m.	Fox	at St. Louis Battlehawks	L 6–12	3–3	The Dome at America's Center	26,684
7	Saturday	May 10	12:00 p.m.	Fox	Michigan Panthers	L 24–25	3–4	Choctaw Stadium	9,963
8	Sunday	May 18	11:00 a.m.	ABC	at DC Defenders	L 30–33	3–5	Audi Field	14,638
9	Saturday	May 24	2:00 p.m.	ESPN3	at Memphis Showboats	W 30–12	4–5	Simmons Bank Liberty Stadium	2,044
10	Sunday	June 1	11:00 a.m.	ABC	at San Antonio Brahmas	W 23–6	5–5	Alamodome	10,863

== Standings ==
2025 UFL standings
USFL Conference
Team	W	L	PCT	GB	TD+/-	TD+	TD-	DIV	PF	PA	DIFF	STK
(y) Birmingham Stallions	7	3	.700	–	8	28	20	5–1	244	167	77	W2
(x) Michigan Panthers	6	4	.600	1	8	30	22	3–3	245	198	47	L2
(e) Houston Roughnecks	5	5	.500	2	0	22	22	3–3	183	201	-18	W2
(e) Memphis Showboats	2	8	.200	5	-13	15	28	1–5	148	246	-98	L2
XFL Conference
Team	W	L	PCT	GB	TD+/-	TD+	TD-	DIV	PF	PA	DIFF	STK
(y) St. Louis Battlehawks	8	2	.800	–	7	26	19	4–2	231	163	68	W6
(x) DC Defenders	6	4	.600	2	3	28	25	4–2	225	224	1	L2
(e) Arlington Renegades	5	5	.500	3	4	23	19	3–3	229	168	61	W2
(e) San Antonio Brahmas	1	9	.100	7	-17	14	31	1–5	136	274	-138	L6
(x)–clinched playoff berth; (y)–clinched conference; (e)–eliminated from playoff contention
