= Ricky Lee (American football) =

American football player (born 1999)

Orlando Storm
- Position: Offensive tackle
- Roster status: Unsigned draft pick

Personal information
- Born: November 16, 1999 (age 27); Jacksonville, Florida, U.S.
- Listed height: 6 ft 5 in (1.96 m)
- Listed weight: 289 lb (131 kg)

Career information
- High school: Robert E. Lee (Jacksonville)
- College: North Carolina Central (2018–2020); North Carolina A&T (2021–2022)
- NFL draft: 2023: undrafted

Career history
- Carolina Panthers (2023); Minnesota Vikings (2024)*; Cleveland Browns (2024)*; New York Giants (2024)*; Arlington Renegades (2025); Jacksonville Jaguars (2025–2026); Orlando Storm (2027-present)
- * Offseason or practice squad member only

Career NFL statistics as of 2025
- Games played: 7
- Stats at Pro Football Reference

Ricky Lee III (born June 11, 1999) is an American professional football offensive tackle. He played college football for the North Carolina Central Eagles before transferring to the North Carolina A&T Aggies. He was signed as an undrafted free agent by the Carolina Panthers after the 2023 NFL draft.

== Early life and education ==
Lee was born on June 11, 1999, and grew up in Jacksonville, Florida. He attended Robert E. Lee High School—now Riverside High School–in his hometown, playing football and basketball; he was a first-team all-district selection at offensive tackle in football. He began his college football career with the North Carolina Central Eagles, starting all 11 games as a freshman and remained a starter as a sophomore in 2019. Lee transferred to rival North Carolina A&T after the 2020 season was canceled due to the COVID-19 pandemic.

In Lee's first season at North Carolina A&T, he started all 11 games and had the second-most snaps played among their offensive linemen with 648. He remained a starter for his senior season in 2022 and was named second-team All-Big South Conference.

== Professional career ==
Pre-draft measurables
Height	Weight	Arm length	Hand span	Wingspan	40-yard dash	10-yard split	20-yard split	20-yard shuttle	Vertical jump	Broad jump
6 ft 5 1/8 in (1.96 m)	289 lb (131 kg)	34 5/8 in (0.88 m)	9 5/8 in (0.24 m)	6 ft 11 3/8 in (2.12 m)	5.42 s	1.77 s	3.13 s	4.96 s	25.0 in (0.64 m)	7 ft 10 in (2.39 m)
All values from HBCU Combine

=== Carolina Panthers ===
After going unselected in the 2023 NFL draft, Lee was signed by the Carolina Panthers as an undrafted free agent, being one of the few players from a historically black college (HBCU) around the league and the only one on the Panthers. He made the team's final roster, being one of only two of the team's undrafted rookies to make the squad as well as one of only 20 HBCU players to make their team's initial roster. He appeared in a total of six games in the 2024 season, being used exclusively on specials teams while seeing action on 24 snaps.

On August 27, 2024, Lee was waived by the Panthers.

=== Minnesota Vikings ===
On August 29, 2024, Lee signed with the Minnesota Vikings' practice squad. He was released on September 17.

=== Cleveland Browns ===
On September 25, 2024, Lee was signed to the Cleveland Browns' practice squad. He was released by the Browns on October 8.

=== New York Giants ===
On December 23, 2024, Lee was signed to the New York Giants' practice squad.

=== Arlington Renegades ===
On January 14, 2025, Lee signed with the Arlington Renegades of the United Football League (UFL).

=== Jacksonville Jaguars ===
On August 1, 2025, Lee was signed by his hometown Jacksonville Jaguars. He was waived on August 26 as part of final roster cuts. The following day, Lee was re-signed to the team's practice squad. He signed a reserve/future contract with Jacksonville on January 12, 2026.

On August 30, 2026, Lee was waived by the Jaguars as a part of final roster cuts.
