= 2025 Birmingham Stallions season =

American professional football season

- Owner: National Spring Football League Enterprises Co, LLC, (Fox Sports)
- General manager: Zach Potter
- Head coach: Skip Holtz
- Home stadium: Protective Stadium

Results
- Record: 7–3
- Conference place: 1st in USFL Conference
- Playoffs: Lost Conference Finals (vs. Panthers) 29–44

Uniform

The 2025 Birmingham Stallions season was the fourth season for the Birmingham Stallions as a professional American football franchise and the second season in the United Football League (UFL). The Stallions played their home games at Protective Stadium and were led by fourth year head coach Skip Holtz.

The Stallions finished the regular season with a 7–3 record, which was then the worst in team history. One of their top highlights was coming back from a 25–6 deficit against the Houston Roughnecks in Week 7, which is the greatest comeback in UFL history. The Stallions went through several quarterbacks throughout the 2025 season, after Alex McGough, Matt Corral and Andrew Peasley all went down with injuries. The team brought back former starter J'Mar Smith, signed spring football veteran Case Cookus and called up Jalen Morton from the Southwest Kansas Storm. Cookus and Smith handled starting duties for most of the season until Corral returned partway through the USFL Conference Championship Game.

For the second consecutive year, the Stallions hosted the Michigan Panthers in the USFL Conference Championship Game, which resulted in their first ever loss against the Panthers and in a playoff game 44–29.

== Schedule ==
All times Central

Week	Day	Date	Kickoff	TV	Opponent	Results		Location	Attendance
Week	Day	Date	Kickoff	TV	Opponent	Score	Record	Location	Attendance
1	Sunday	March 30	2:00 p.m.	ESPN	at DC Defenders	L 11–18	0–1	Audi Field	12,254
2	Friday	April 4	7:00 p.m.	Fox	at Michigan Panthers	W 21–12	1–1	Ford Field	10,049
3	Friday	April 11	7:00 p.m.	Fox	Arlington Renegades	W 10–9	2–1	Protective Stadium	10,126
4	Saturday	April 19	6:00 p.m.	Fox	at Houston Roughnecks	W 23–16	3–1	Space City Financial Stadium	6,613
5	Friday	April 25	7:00 p.m.	Fox	Memphis Showboats	L 20–24 (OT)	3–2	Protective Stadium	9,127
6	Sunday	May 4	3:00 p.m.	Fox	San Antonio Brahmas	W 26–3	4–2	Protective Stadium	9,627
7	Sunday	May 11	11:00 a.m.	ABC	Houston Roughnecks	W 33–25	5–2	Protective Stadium	4,774
8	Saturday	May 17	12:00 p.m.	Fox	at St. Louis Battlehawks	L 28–29	5–3	The Dome at America's Center	30,114
9	Saturday	May 24	2:00 p.m.	ABC	Michigan Panthers	W 26–22	6–3	Protective Stadium	10,344
10	Sunday	June 1	2:00 p.m.	Fox	at Memphis Showboats	W 46–9	7–3	Simmons Bank Liberty Stadium	4,573

== Final roster ==
2025 Birmingham Stallions final roster
Quarterbacks: 6 Case Cookus; 2 Matt Corral; 14 Andrew Peasley; 1 J'Mar Smith; Running backs: 11 C. J. Marable; 23 Ricky Person Jr.; 34 Larry Rountree III; Wide receivers: 8 Deon Cain; 81 Jalen Camp; 13 Davion Davis; 88 Cade Johnson; 3 Amari Rodgers; 17 Marlon Williams; Tight ends: 85 Marcus Baugh; 12 Jace Sternberger; 81 Jordan Thomas	Offensive linemen: 65 Deonte Brown G; 74 Christian DiLauro T; 72 Darius Harper T; 63 Grant Miller G; 56 Cole Schneider C; 78 Keaton Sutherland G/C; 73 Armani Taylor-Prioleau T; 69 Barry Wesley G/T; Defensive linemen: 90 Bradlee Anae DE; 96 Carlos Davis DT; 99 Steve Linton DE; 44 Max Roberts DE; 41 Myjai Sanders DE; 43 Delontae Scott DE; 58 Marvin Wilson DT; 98 Perrion Winfrey DT; 97 Willie Yarbary DT	Linebackers: 20 Tae Crowder; 47 DeMarquis Gates; 30 Chapelle Russell; 31 Kyahva Tezino; Defensive backs: 5 Shyheim Carter SS; 24 Nevelle Clarke CB; 22 Steven Gilmore Jr. CB; 16 Mario Goodrich CB; 28 Tommi Hill CB; 19 Daniel Isom CB; 21 Tre Norwood FS; 9 Kenny Robinson SS; 4 JoJo Tillery SS; Special teams: 27 Ryan Langan LS; 18 Harrison Mevis K; 15 Colby Wadman P	Reserve lists: 36 Madre Harper CB (IR); 10 Alex McGough QB (IR); -- Isaiah Moore LB Retired; 7 Ronnie Perkins DE (IR); 80 La'Michael Pettway TE (IR); 60 Lachavious Simmons G/T (IR); -- Shi Smith WR Retired; 35 A. J. Thomas LB (IR); 49 active, 8 inactive

== Staff ==
2025 Birmingham Stallions staff
Front office: General manager – Paul Roell; Head coaches: Head coach/co-offensive coordinator/Quarterbacks – Skip Holtz; Offensive coaches: Wide receivers – Mike Jones; Offensive line – Dave DeGuglielmo	Defensive coaches: Defensive coordinator – Corey Chamblin; Defensive line – Ron Burton; Linebackers – Daric Riley; Special teams coaches: Special teams coordinator – Chris Boniol

== Standings ==
2025 UFL standings
USFL Conference
Team	W	L	PCT	GB	TD+/-	TD+	TD-	DIV	PF	PA	DIFF	STK
(y) Birmingham Stallions	7	3	.700	–	8	28	20	5–1	244	167	77	W2
(x) Michigan Panthers	6	4	.600	1	8	30	22	3–3	245	198	47	L2
(e) Houston Roughnecks	5	5	.500	2	0	22	22	3–3	183	201	-18	W2
(e) Memphis Showboats	2	8	.200	5	-13	15	28	1–5	148	246	-98	L2
XFL Conference
Team	W	L	PCT	GB	TD+/-	TD+	TD-	DIV	PF	PA	DIFF	STK
(y) St. Louis Battlehawks	8	2	.800	–	7	26	19	4–2	231	163	68	W6
(x) DC Defenders	6	4	.600	2	3	28	25	4–2	225	224	1	L2
(e) Arlington Renegades	5	5	.500	3	4	23	19	3–3	229	168	61	W2
(e) San Antonio Brahmas	1	9	.100	7	-17	14	31	1–5	136	274	-138	L6
(x)–clinched playoff berth; (y)–clinched conference; (e)–eliminated from playoff contention

== Postseason ==
=== Schedule ===
Week	Day	Date	Kickoff	TV	Opponent	Results		Location	Attendance
Week	Day	Date	Kickoff	TV	Opponent	Score	Record	Location	Attendance
USFL Conference Championship	Sunday	June 8	2:00 p.m.	ABC	vs. Michigan Panthers	29–44	0–1	Protective Stadium	10,928
