= 2025 St. Louis Battlehawks season =

American professional football season

- Owner: Alpha Acquico, LLC
- General manager: Dave Boller
- Head coach: Anthony Becht
- Home stadium: The Dome at America's Center

Results
- Record: 8–2
- Conference place: 1st in XFL Conference
- Playoffs: Lost Conference Finals (vs. Defenders) 18–36

Uniform

The 2025 St. Louis Battlehawks season was the fourth season for the St. Louis Battlehawks as a professional American football franchise and the second season in the United Football League (UFL). The Battlehawks played their home games at The Dome at America's Center and were led by third year head coach Anthony Becht.

In 2025, the Battlehawks re-signed 2024 Offensive Player of the Year wide receiver Hakeem Butler for his third stint. In week four, starting quarterback Manny Wilkins was lost for the season when he tore his right achilles tendon against the Arlington Renegades.

The Battlehawks finished the season with a league-leading 8–2 record, the best record in team history. The Battlehawks played in their second consecutive XFL Conference Championship Game, hosting the DC Defenders. The Battlehawks were defeated, 18–36.

== Draft ==
The UFL held its first draft since the creation of the league on July 17, 2024.

Rnd	Pick No.	Player	Pos.	College
1	5	Chevan Cordeiro	QB	San Jose State
2	13	Cody Schrader	RB	Missouri
3	21	Pheldarius Payne	DE	Virginia Tech
4	29	Bradley Ashmore	OT	Vanderbilt
5	37	Carl Jones Jr.	LB	UCLA
6	45	Isaiah Coe	DT	Oklahoma
7	53	Jelani Baker	WR	Limestone
8	61	Jadon Janke	WR	South Dakota State
9	69	Myles Sims	CB	Georgia Tech
10	77	Myles Jones	CB	Duke

== Roster ==
2025 St. Louis Battlehawks final roster
Quarterbacks: 9 Chevan Cordeiro; 14 Max Duggan; 18 Brandon Silvers; Running backs: 41 Jarveon Howard; 25 Kevon Latulas; 15 Jacob Saylors; Wide receivers: 88 Hakeem Butler; 2 Frank Darby; 8 Blake Jackson; 12 Gary Jennings Jr.; 85 Jerome Kapp; 1 Jahcour Pearson; 82 Sam Wiglusz; Tight ends: 87 Chase Allen; 84 Jake Sutherland	Offensive linemen: 70 Bradley Ashmore T; 73 Juwann Bushell-Beatty T; 69 Ryan Coll G; 74 Steven Gonzalez G; 75 Jaryd Jones-Smith T; 61 Mike Panasiuk C; 50 Teton Saltes T; 76 Cole Spencer G; 54 Dohnovan West G/C; Defensive linemen: 98 Freedom Akinmoladun DE; 90 Kyler Baugh DT; 99 Austin Faoliu DT; 92 Phil Hoskins DE; 93 T. J. Pesefea DT	Linebackers: 56 Travis Feeney OLB; 51 Willie Harvey Jr. ILB; 59 Callahan O'Reilly ILB; 27 Mike Rose ILB; 7 Pita Taumoepenu OLB; 58 Shaka Toney OLB; 26 Carson Wells OLB; Defensive backs: 21 Micah Abraham CB; 32 Qwynnterrio Cole SS; 23 Lukas Denis FS; 24 Myles Jones CB; 23 Kameron Kelly FS; 29 Mac McCain CB; 22 Nate Meadors SS; 6 Myles Sims CB; 10 Nick Whiteside CB; 20 Avery Young SS; Special teams: 28 Rodrigo Blankenship K; 16 Sterling Hofrichter P; 47 Alex Matheson LS	Reserve lists: 62 Abdul Beecham G (IR); -- Mataeo Durant RB Retired; 48 Chris Garrett OLB (IR); 97 Isaiah Mack DT (IR); 9 Chris Payton-Jones CB (IR); 38 Brandon Sebastian CB (IR); -- Kobe Smith DE Retired; 5 Manny Wilkins QB (IR); 49 active, 8 inactive

== Staff ==
St. Louis BattleHawks staff
Front office: Director of team operations – Anastasia Ali; Director of media relations – Brian Stull; General manager – Dave Boller; Head coach: Head coach – Anthony Becht; Offensive coaches: Offensive coordinator/Wide receivers – Phil McGeoghan; Quarterbacks – Seneca Wallace; Running backs/special teams – Kyle Caskey; Offensive line – Marc Colombo	Defensive coaches: Defensive coordinator – Donnie Abraham; Defensive line – La'Roi Glover; Linebackers – Chris Claiborne; Secondary – Martin Bayless; Team operations: Athletic trainer – Eric Avila; Equipment manager – Todd Hewitt; Video manager – Brendan Taylor

== Schedule ==
All times Central

Week	Day	Date	Kickoff	TV	Opponent	Results		Location	Attendance
Week	Day	Date	Kickoff	TV	Opponent	Score	Record	Location	Attendance
1	Friday	March 28	7:00 p.m.	Fox	at Houston Roughnecks	W 31–6	1–0	Space City Financial Stadium	7,124
2	Sunday	April 6	5:30 p.m.	FS1	San Antonio Brahmas	W 26–9	2–0	The Dome at America's Center	32,115
3	Sunday	April 13	2:00 p.m.	ABC	DC Defenders	L 15–27	2–1	The Dome at America's Center	30,014
4	Saturday	April 19	11:30 a.m.	ABC	at Arlington Renegades	L 15–30	2–2	Choctaw Stadium	9,614
5	Saturday	April 26	6:00 p.m.	ESPN	Michigan Panthers	W 32–27	3–2	The Dome at America's Center	30,406
6	Friday	May 2	7:00 p.m.	Fox	Arlington Renegades	W 12–6	4–2	The Dome at America's Center	26,684
7	Sunday	May 11	2:00 p.m.	ESPN	at Memphis Showboats	W 19–9	5–2	Simmons Bank Liberty Stadium	4,215
8	Saturday	May 17	12:00 p.m.	Fox	Birmingham Stallions	W 29–28	6–2	The Dome at America's Center	30,114
9	Friday	May 23	7:00 p.m.	Fox	San Antonio Brahmas (Note: This game was original intended to be played in San Antonio but was shifted to be played in St. Louis due to scheduling conflicts at the Alamodome. San Antonio was the designated home team for this game.)	W 39–13	7–2	The Dome at America's Center	27,890
10	Friday	May 30	7:00 p.m.	Fox	at DC Defenders	W 13–8	8–2	Audi Field	12,624

=== Game summaries ===
==== Week 1: at Houston Roughnecks ====
Week 1: St. Louis Battlehawks at Houston Roughnecks – Game summary

Quarter	1	2	3	4	Total
Battlehawks	6	12	0	13	31
Roughnecks	0	0	0	6	6

at Space City Financial Stadium, Houston, Texas

- Date: March 28
- Game time: 7:00 p.m. CDT
- Game attendance: 7,124
- Referee: Kole Knueppel
- TV announcers (Fox): Curt Menefee, Joel Klatt and Brock Huard

Game information

First quarter

- STL – Jacob Saylors 4-yard run (2-pt Conversion No Good), 4:44. BattleHawks 6–0. Drive: 10 Plays, 58 Yards, 5:30.

Second quarter

- STL – Manny Wilkins 1-yard run (2-pt Conversion No Good), 13:16. BattleHawks 12–0. Drive: 9 Plays, 84 Yards, 4:35.
- STL – Rodrigo Blankenship 48-yard field goal, 2:00. BattleHawks 15–0. Drive: 11 Plays, 41 Yards, 6:28.
- STL – Rodrigo Blankenship 33-yard field goal, 2:00. BattleHawks 18–0. Drive: 7 Plays, 32 Yards, :57.

Third quarter

- No scoring plays.

Fourth quarter

- STL – Manny Wilkins 1-yard run (1-pt Conversion No Good), 13:35. BattleHawks 24–0. Drive: 12 Plays, 72 Yards, 7:43.
- STL – Jarveon Howard 74-yard run (Max Duggan 1-pt Conversion Run Good), 6:34. BattleHawks 31–0. Drive: 2 Plays, 89 Yards, :54.
- HOU – Justin Hall 5-yard pass from Nolan Henderson (2-pt Conversion No Good), 2:24. BattleHawks 31–6. Drive: 8 Plays, 65 Yards, 3:57.

Top passers

- STL – Manny Wilkins – 17/22, 189 yards
- HOU – Nolan Henderson – 7/18, 68 yards, TD

Top rushers

- STL – Jarveon Howard – 13 rushes, 115 yards, TD
- HOU – Nolan Henderson – 4 rushes, 54 yards

Top receivers

- STL – Jahcour Pearson – 6 receptions, 83 yards
- HOU – Justin Hall – 5 receptions, 40 yards, TD

==== Week 2: San Antonio Brahmas ====
Week 2: San Antonio Brahmas at St. Louis Battlehawks – Game summary

Quarter	1	2	3	4	Total
Brahmas	0	3	6	0	9
Battlehawks	3	14	6	3	26

at The Dome at America's Center, St. Louis, Missouri

- Date: April 6
- Game time: 5:30 p.m. CDT
- Game attendance: 32,115
- Referee: Chris Coyte
- TV announcers (FS1): Connor Onion, Joel Klatt and Devin Gardner

Game information

First quarter

- STL – Rodrigo Blankenship 45-yard field goal, 1:49. BattleHawks 3–0. Drive: 8 Plays, 44 Yards, 5:33.

Second quarter

- STL – Jacob Saylors 20-yard run (Jacob Saylors 2-pt Conversion Run Good), 11:10. BattleHawks 11–0. Drive: 7 Plays, 75 Yards, 3:41.
- STL – Jacob Saylors 1-yard run (2-pt Conversion No Good), 3:24. BattleHawks 17–0. Drive: 7 Plays, 78 Yards, 4:11.
- SA – Donald De La Haye 31-yard field goal, :04. BattleHawks 17–3. Drive: 12 Plays, 63 Yards, 3:21.

Third quarter

- STL – Jacob Saylors 5-yard run (1-pt Conversion No Good), 7:47. BattleHawks 23–3. Drive: 12 Plays, 70 Yards, 7:19.
- SA – Jashaun Corbin 5-yard run (1-pt Conversion No Good), 4:32. BattleHawks 23–9. Drive: 6 Plays, 53 Yards, 3:13.

Fourth quarter

- STL – Rodrigo Blankenship 22-yard field goal, 10:07. BattleHawks 26–9. Drive: 9 Plays, 32 Yards, 6:40.

Top passers

- STL – Manny Wilkins – 12/16, 162 yards
- SA – Kellen Mond – 13/27, 129 yards, INT

Top rushers

- STL – Manny Wilkins – 9 rushes, 58 yards
- SA – Anthony McFarland – 6 rushes, 55 yards

Top receivers

- STL – Gary Jennings Jr. – 1 reception, 58 yards
- SA – Jacob Harris – 3 receptions, 69 yards

==== Week 3: DC Defenders ====
Week 3: DC Defenders at St. Louis Battlehawks – Game summary

Quarter	1	2	3	4	Total
Defenders	12	6	0	9	27
Battlehawks	0	12	3	0	15

at The Dome at America's Center, St. Louis, Missouri

- Date: April 13
- Game time: 2:00 p.m. CDT
- Game attendance: 30,014
- Referee: Bryan Banks
- TV announcers (ABC): Joe Tessitore, Jordan Rodgers, Tom Luginbill and Eric Mac Lain

Game information

First quarter

- DC – Matt McCrane 30-yard field goal, 9:09. Defenders 3–0. Drive: 4 Plays, 0 Yards, 1:39.
- DC – Ty Scott 62-yard pass from Jordan Ta'amu (2-pt Conversion No Good), 4:33. Defenders 9–0. Drive: 5 Plays, 74 Yards, 2:14.
- DC – Matt McCrane 42-yard field goal, 1:47. Defenders 12–0. Drive: 4 Plays, 3 Yards, 1:28.

Second quarter

- STL – Frank Darby 35-yard pass from Manny Wilkins (2-pt Conversion No Good), 9:56. Defenders 12–6. Drive: 3 Plays, 35 Yards, 1:31.
- STL – Rodrigo Blankenship 40-yard field goal, 6:10. Defenders 12–9. Drive: 4 Plays, 7 Yards, 1:47.
- DC – Briley Moore 10-yard pass from Jordan Ta'amu (2-pt Conversion No Good), 2:24. Defenders 18–9. Drive: 8 Plays, 76 Yards, 3:48.
- STL – Rodrigo Blankenship 47-yard field goal, :56. Defenders 18–12. Drive: 8 Plays, 40 Yards, 1:29.

Third quarter

- STL – Rodrigo Blankenship 56-yard field goal, 7:39. Defenders 18–15. Drive: 4 Plays, 7 Yards, 1:47.

Fourth quarter

- DC – Cornell Powell 3-yard pass from Jordan Ta'amu (1-pt Conversion No Good), 2:21. Defenders 24–15. Drive: 10 Plays, 77 Yards, 6:16.
- DC – Matt McCrane 50-yard field goal, :08. Defenders 27–15. Drive: 6 Plays, 14 Yards, 1:34.

Top passers

- STL – Manny Wilkins – 16/29, 147 yards, TD, 3 INT
- DC – Jordan Ta'amu – 17/37, 243 yards, 3 TD, 2 INT

Top rushers

- STL – Manny Wilkins – 4 rushes, 39 yards
- DC – Deon Jackson – 8 rushes, 54 yards

Top receivers

- STL – Jacob Saylors – 7 receptions, 91 yards
- DC – Ty Scott – 3 receptions, 85 yards, TD

==== Week 4: at Arlington Renegades ====
Week 4: St. Louis Battlehawks at Arlington Renegades – Game summary

Quarter	1	2	3	4	Total
Battlehawks	3	3	9	0	15
Renegades	16	0	0	14	30

at Choctaw Stadium, Arlington, Texas

- Date: April 19
- Game time: 11:30 a.m. CDT
- Game attendance: 9,614
- Referee: Francisco Villar
- TV announcers (ABC): Roy Philpott, Roddy Jones, Harry Douglas and Cole Cubelic

Game information

First quarter

- ARL – Chris Odom 31-yard fumble recovery (JaVonta Payton 2-pt Conversion pass from Luis Perez Good) Renegades 8–0.
- STL – Rodrigo Blankenship 55-yard field goal, 8:30. Renegades 8–3. Drive: 7 Plays, 20 Yards, 4:01.
- ARL – JaVonta Payton 2-yard pass from Luis Perez (Tyler Vaughns 2-pt Conversion pass from Luis Perez Good) Renegades 16–3. Drive: 6 Plays, 42 Yards, 2:52.

Second quarter

- STL – Rodrigo Blankenship 31-yard field goal, 1:35. Renegades 16–6. Drive: 14 Plays, 57 Yards, 8:20.

Third quarter

- STL – Rodrigo Blankenship 53-yard field goal, 11:34. Renegades 16–9. Drive: 4 Plays, -6 Yards, 1:54.
- STL – Willie Harvey Jr. 56-yard interception return (1-pt Conversion No Good), 3:25. Renegades 16–15.

Fourth quarter

- ARL – Dae Dae Hunter 4-yard run (2-pt Conversion No Good), 3:25. Renegades 22–15. Drive: 8 Plays, 72 Yards, 3:32.
- ARL – Ajene Harris 102-yard interception return (JaVonta Payton 2-pt Conversion pass from Luis Perez), :33. Renegades 30–15.

Top passers

- STL – Max Duggan – 8/17, 78 yards, 2 INT
- ARL – Luis Perez – 17/25, 149 yards, TD, INT

Top rushers

- STL – Jacob Saylors – 20 rushes, 61 yards
- ARL – Dae Dae Hunter – 8 rushes, 32 yards, TD

Top receivers

- STL – Frank Darby – 2 receptions, 26 yards
- ARL – Sal Cannella – 3 receptions, 35 yards

==== Week 5: Michigan Panthers ====
Week 5: Michigan Panthers at St. Louis Battlehawks – Game summary

Quarter	1	2	3	4	Total
Panthers	6	0	8	13	27
Battlehawks	3	14	3	12	32

at The Dome at America's Center, St. Louis, Missouri

- Date: April 26
- Game time: 6:00 p.m. CDT
- Game attendance: 30,406
- Referee: Michael Vandervelde
- TV announcers (ESPN): Joe Tessitore, Jordan Rodgers, Sam Acho and Dawn Davenport

Game information

First quarter

- STL – Rodrigo Blankenship 44-yard field goal, 8:36. BattleHawks 3–0. Drive: 8 Plays, 31 Yards, 4:27.
- MICH – Gunnar Oakes 12-yard pass from Bryce Perkins (1-pt Conversion No Good), 3:58. Panthers 6–3. Drive: 8 Plays, 72 Yards, 4:39.

Second quarter

- STL – Max Duggan 1-yard run (1-pt Conversion No Good), 5:40. BattleHawks 9–6. Drive: 9 Plays, 68 Yards, 5:12.
- STL – Max Duggan 8-yard run (Jake Sutherland 2-pt Conversion pass from Max Duggan Good), :35. BattleHawks 17–6. Drive: 3 Plays, 30 Yards, 1:12.

Third quarter

- STL – Rodrigo Blankenship 28-yard field goal, 9:23. BattleHawks 20–6. Drive: 9 Plays, 64 Yards, 5:42.
- MICH – Malik Turner 20-yard pass from Bryce Perkins (Cole Hikutini 2-pt Conversion pass from Bryce Perkins Good), 2:59. BattleHawks 20–14. Drive: 12 Plays, 75 Yards, 6:25.

Fourth quarter

- MICH – Toa Taua 5-yard run (Nate McCrary 1-pt Conversion run Good), 12:58. Panthers 21–20. Drive: 5 Plays, 56 Yards, 2:40.
- STL – Hakeem Butler 67-yard pass from Max Duggan (2-pt Conversion No Good), 12:05. BattleHawks 26–21. Drive: 2 Plays, 68 Yards, :58.
- MICH – Toa Taua 4-yard run (2-pt Conversion No Good), 6:56. Panthers 27–26. Drive: 8 Plays, 77 Yards, 5:04.
- STL – Hakeem Butler 57-yard pass from Blake Jackson (2-pt Conversion No Good), 6:12. BattleHawks 32–27. Drive: 2 Plays, 58 Yards, :49.

Top passers

- STL – Max Duggan – 9/12, 124 yards, TD
- MICH – Bryce Perkins – 21/25, 235 yards, 2 TD

Top rushers

- STL – Max Duggan – 10 rushes, 70 yards, 2 TD
- MICH – Toa Taua – 15 rushes, 74 yards, 2 TD

Top receivers

- STL – Hakeem Butler – 2 reception, 124 yards, 2 TD
- MICH – Siaosi Mariner – 6 receptions, 111 yards

==== Week 6: Arlington Renegades ====
Week 6: Arlington Renegades at St. Louis Battlehawks – Game summary

Quarter	1	2	3	4	Total
Renegades	0	0	0	6	6
Battlehawks	0	9	0	3	12

at The Dome at America's Center, St. Louis, Missouri

- Date: May 2
- Game time: 7:00 p.m. CDT
- Game attendance: 26,684
- Referee: Jason Autrey
- TV announcers (Fox): Curt Menefee, Joel Klatt and Brock Huard

Game information

First quarter

- No scoring plays.

Second quarter

- STL – Hakeem Butler 30-yard pass from Max Duggan (2-pt Conversion No Good), 2:00. BattleHawks 6–0. Drive: 3 Plays, 34 Yards, 1:14.
- STL – Rodrigo Blankenship 49-yard field goal, :02. BattleHawks 9–0. Drive: 6 Plays, 36 Yards, :37.

Third quarter

- No scoring plays.

Fourth quarter

- ARL – Lucas Havrisik 46-yard field goal, 15:00. BattleHawks 9–3. Drive: 12 Plays, 47 Yards, 8:33.
- ARL – Lucas Havrisik 26-yard field goal, 11:47. BattleHawks 9–6. Drive: 4 Plays, 2 Yards, 1:33.
- STL – Rodrigo Blankenship 53-yard field goal, 6:28. BattleHawks 12–6. Drive: 9 Plays, 32 Yards, 5:22.

Top passers

- STL – Max Duggan – 7/19, 93 yards, TD
- ARL – Luis Perez – 16/23, 145 yards, INT

Top rushers

- STL – Jacob Saylors – 14 rushes, 57 yards
- ARL – Dae Dae Hunter – 13 rushes, 47 yards

Top receivers

- STL – Blake Jackson – 3 reception, 31 yards
- ARL – Dae Dae Hunter – 5 receptions, 41 yards

==== Week 7: at Memphis Showboats ====
Week 7: St. Louis Battlehawks at Memphis Showboats – Game summary

Quarter	1	2	3	4	Total
Battlehawks	10	6	0	3	19
Showboats	0	6	3	0	9

at Simmons Bank Liberty Stadium, Memphis, Tennessee

- Date: April 19
- Game time: 2:00 p.m. CDT
- Game weather: 68 F
- Referee: Bryan Banks
- TV announcers (ESPN): Roddy Jones, Roy Philpott, Cole Cubelic and Harry Douglas

Game information

First quarter

- STL – Max Duggan 7-yard run (Jarveon Howard 1-pt Conversion Good), 5:56. Battlehawks 7–0. Drive: 5 Plays, 47 Yards, 2:49.
- STL – Rodrigo Blankenship 53-yard field goal, 1:57. Battlehawks 10–0. Drive: 4 Plays, 4 Yards, 2:05.

Second quarter

- MEM – Jonathan Adams 5-yard pass from Dresser Winn (1-pt Conversion No Good), 1:50. Battlehawks 10–6. Drive: 11 Plays, 77 Yards, 5:22.
- STL – Jahcour Pearson 13-yard pass from Max Duggan (1-pt Conversion No Good), :45. Battlehawks 16–6. Drive: 8 Plays, 78 Yards, 1:10.

Third quarter

- MEM – Matt Coghlin 27-yard field goal, 2:13. Battlehawks 16–9. Drive: 7 Plays, 44 Yards, 3:29.

Fourth quarter

- STL – Rodrigo Blankenship 44-yard field goal, 1:35. Battlehawks 19–9. Drive: 6 Plays, 18 Yards, 3:15.

Top passers

- STL – Max Duggan – 15/23, 158 yards, TD, INT
- MEM – Dresser Winn – 21/34, 196 yards, TD

Top rushers

- STL – Max Duggan – 10 rushes, 57 yards, TD
- MEM – Deneric Prince – 17 rushes, 44 yards

Top receivers

- STL – Gary Jennings Jr. – 3 receptions, 61 yards
- MEM – Jonathan Adams – 4 receptions, 69 yards, TD

== Standings ==
2025 UFL standings
USFL Conference
Team	W	L	PCT	GB	TD+/-	TD+	TD-	DIV	PF	PA	DIFF	STK
(y) Birmingham Stallions	7	3	.700	–	8	28	20	5–1	244	167	77	W2
(x) Michigan Panthers	6	4	.600	1	8	30	22	3–3	245	198	47	L2
(e) Houston Roughnecks	5	5	.500	2	0	22	22	3–3	183	201	-18	W2
(e) Memphis Showboats	2	8	.200	5	-13	15	28	1–5	148	246	-98	L2
XFL Conference
Team	W	L	PCT	GB	TD+/-	TD+	TD-	DIV	PF	PA	DIFF	STK
(y) St. Louis Battlehawks	8	2	.800	–	7	26	19	4–2	231	163	68	W6
(x) DC Defenders	6	4	.600	2	3	28	25	4–2	225	224	1	L2
(e) Arlington Renegades	5	5	.500	3	4	23	19	3–3	229	168	61	W2
(e) San Antonio Brahmas	1	9	.100	7	-17	14	31	1–5	136	274	-138	L6
(x)–clinched playoff berth; (y)–clinched conference; (e)–eliminated from playoff contention

== Postseason ==
=== Schedule ===
Week	Day	Date	Kickoff	TV	Opponent	Results		Location	Attendance
Week	Day	Date	Kickoff	TV	Opponent	Score	Record	Location	Attendance
XFL Conference Championship	Sunday	June 8	5:00 p.m.	Fox	vs. DC Defenders	18–36	0–1	The Dome at America's Center	27,589
