= 2025 Houston Roughnecks season =

American professional football season

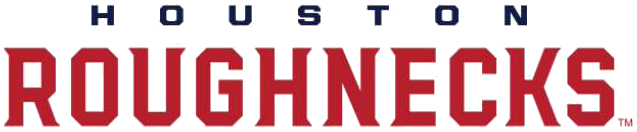
- Owner: National Spring Football League Enterprises Co, LLC, (Fox Sports)
- General manager: Will Lewis
- Head coach: Curtis Johnson
- Home stadium: Space City Financial Stadium

Results
- Record: 5–5
- Conference place: 3rd in USFL Conference
- Playoffs: Did not qualify

Uniform

The 2025 Houston Roughnecks season was the fourth season for the Houston Roughnecks as a professional American football franchise and the second season in the United Football League (UFL). The Roughnecks played their home games at the renovated and renamed Space City Financial Stadium and head coach Curtis Johnson will return, but general manager Lionel Vital retired at the end of the last season, so the team hired Will Lewis to be his replacement. The Roughnecks improved on their 1–9 record from last season with a 27–3 win over the San Antonio Brahmas in Week 5.

The Roughnecks had an 1–3 start, and went 4–2 to finish the season, tying the Houston Gamblers from 2023 for the best record in team history.

The biggest lowlight of the season came in Week 7 against the three-time champions Birmingham Stallions, where they blew a 25–6 lead, which is the biggest blown lead in UFL history. After a 30–18 loss to the Michigan Panthers the following week, the Roughnecks were eliminated from playoff contention.

== Schedule ==
All times Central

Week	Day	Date	Kickoff	TV	Opponent	Results		Location	Attendance
Week	Day	Date	Kickoff	TV	Opponent	Score	Record	Location	Attendance
1	Friday	March 28	7:00 p.m.	Fox	St. Louis Battlehawks	L 6–31	0–1	Space City Financial Stadium	7,124
2	Sunday	April 6	11:00 a.m.	ESPN	at Arlington Renegades	L 9–11	0–2	Choctaw Stadium	9,582
3	Saturday	April 12	1:30 p.m.	ESPN	at Memphis Showboats	W 18–17	1–2	Simmons Bank Liberty Stadium	4,753
4	Saturday	April 19	6:00 p.m.	Fox	Birmingham Stallions	L 16–23	1–3	Space City Financial Stadium	6,613
5	Sunday	April 27	2:00 p.m.	ESPN	at San Antonio Brahmas	W 27–3	2–3	Alamodome	14,427
6	Saturday	May 3	11:00 a.m.	ABC	Memphis Showboats	W 21–20	3–3	Space City Financial Stadium	4,134
7	Sunday	May 11	11:00 a.m.	ABC	at Birmingham Stallions	L 25–33	3–4	Protective Stadium	4,744
8	Saturday	May 17	12:00 p.m.	Fox	Michigan Panthers	L 18–30	3–5	Space City Financial Stadium	4,007
9	Sunday	May 25	3:00 p.m.	Fox	DC Defenders	W 24–21	4–5	Space City Financial Stadium	6,684
10	Saturday	May 31	2:00 p.m.	ESPN	at Michigan Panthers	W 19–12	5–5	Ford Field	16,014

== Final roster ==
2025 Houston Roughnecks final roster
Quarterbacks: 13 Anthony Brown; 14 Nolan Henderson; 8 Jalan McClendon; Running backs: 27 Lorenzo Lingard; 22 Kirk Merritt; 6 ZaQuandre White; Wide receivers: 18 Emmanuel Butler; 3 Keke Chism; 7 Cyril Grayson; 11 Justin Hall; 16 Marcus Simms; 19 T. J. Vasher; Tight ends: 86 Josh Pederson; 10 Geor'Quarius Spivey; 89 Cam Sutton	Offensive linemen: 66 Noah Atagi G; 78 Zach Banner T; 79 Isaiah Battle T; 75 T. J. Bradley T; 74 Avery Gennesy G; 73 Samuel Jackson T/G; 54 Avery Jones C/G; 65 Jack Kramer C; Defensive linemen: 2 Christopher Allen DE; 95 Israel Antwine DT; 43 Rashod Berry DE; 4 Tashawn Bower DE; 96 T.J. Franklin DE; 44 Jamir Jones DE; 97 Glen Logan DT; 92 Darrius Moragne DT; 52 Lonnie Phelps DE; 94 Olive Sagapolu DT	Linebackers: 30 Xavier Benson; 20 Drew Lewis; 28 Marvin Moody Jr.; 33 J. T. Tyler; Defensive backs: 26 Damon Arnette CB; 29 Corn Elder FS; 24 Keenan Isaac CB; 25 Armani Marsh CB; 1 Leon O'Neal Jr. SS; 12 Shawn Preston Jr SS; 9 Colby Richardson CB; 31 Markel Roby SS; 21 Ja'Quan Sheppard CB; 23 Rayshad Williams FS; Special teams: 5 Chris Blewitt K; 45 Marco Ortiz LS; 47 Mike Rivers P	Reserve lists: -- Cary Angeline TE Retired; 15 Lawrence Keys III WR (IR); -- Davius Richard QB Retired; 50 active, 3 inactive

== Staff ==
2025 Houston Roughnecks staff
Front office: General manager – Will Lewis; Head coaches: Head coach – Curtis Johnson; Offensive coaches: Pass game coordinator/quarterbacks - Eric Price; Running backs/special teams - Garrett Chachere; Run game coordinator/offensive line - Tom Cable; Offensive Quality Control - Jordan Higgins	Defensive coaches: Defensive coordinator/linebackers – Chris Wilson; Defensive line – Kwahn Drake; Defensive backs/special teams – Brett Maxie; Defensive quality control - Zach Shagi

== Standings ==
2025 UFL standings
USFL Conference
Team	W	L	PCT	GB	TD+/-	TD+	TD-	DIV	PF	PA	DIFF	STK
(y) Birmingham Stallions	7	3	.700	–	8	28	20	5–1	244	167	77	W2
(x) Michigan Panthers	6	4	.600	1	8	30	22	3–3	245	198	47	L2
(e) Houston Roughnecks	5	5	.500	2	0	22	22	3–3	183	201	-18	W2
(e) Memphis Showboats	2	8	.200	5	-13	15	28	1–5	148	246	-98	L2
XFL Conference
Team	W	L	PCT	GB	TD+/-	TD+	TD-	DIV	PF	PA	DIFF	STK
(y) St. Louis Battlehawks	8	2	.800	–	7	26	19	4–2	231	163	68	W6
(x) DC Defenders	6	4	.600	2	3	28	25	4–2	225	224	1	L2
(e) Arlington Renegades	5	5	.500	3	4	23	19	3–3	229	168	61	W2
(e) San Antonio Brahmas	1	9	.100	7	-17	14	31	1–5	136	274	-138	L6
(x)–clinched playoff berth; (y)–clinched conference; (e)–eliminated from playoff contention
