= List of DC Defenders seasons =

This article is a list of seasons of the DC Defenders, an American football franchise of the UFL. The list documents the season-by-season records of the Defenders' franchise from 2020 to present, including postseason records and league awards for individual players or head coaches. The Defenders franchise was founded in 2018 with the recreation of the league. The team has earned one postseason appearance and competed in the first XFL Championship of the modern era of the league.

== Seasons ==
UFL champions^{†} (2024–present)	XFL champions^{§} (2023)	Conference champions^{*}	Division champions^{^}	Wild Card berth^{#}

Season	Team	League	Conference	Division	Regular season			Postseason results	Awards	Head coaches	Pct.
Season	Team	League	Conference	Division	Finish	W	L	Postseason results	Awards	Head coaches	Pct.
2020	2020	XFL	—N/a	East	1st	3	2	Season Suspended after 5 games due to COVID-19		Pep Hamilton	.600
2021	—										
2022	—										
2023	2023	XFL	—N/a	North ^{^}	1st ^{#}	9	1	Won Division Finals (Sea Dragons) 37–21; Lost XFL Championship (Renegades) 26–35	Jordan Ta'amu (OPOY); Reggie Barlow (COTY)	Reggie Barlow	.650
2024	2024	UFL	XFL	—N/a	3rd	4	6			Reggie Barlow	.650
2025	2025	UFL ^{†}	XFL ^{*}	—N/a	2nd ^{#}	6	4	Won XFL Conference Championship (at Battlehawks) 36–18; Won UFL Championship (at Panthers) 58–34	Shannon Harris (COTY); Fred Kaiss (ACOTY)	Shannon Harris	.550
2026	2026	UFL	—N/a	—N/a	4th ^{#}	5	5	Won Semifinals (at Storm) 28–22; Lost United Bowl (vs. Kings) 20–27		Shannon Harris	.550
Total						27	18	All-time regular season record (2020–2026)			.600
Total						4	2	All-time postseason record (2020–2026)			.667
Total						30	20	All-time regular season and postseason record (2020–2026)			.600
Total						1 division title, 1 UFL Championship					
