= 2024 XFL season =

- League: XFL
- Sport: American football
- Games: 43 (40 regular-season games, 3 postseason games) (planned)
- Teams: 8 (planned)
- TV partner(s): ABC, ESPN, ESPN2, FX
- Streaming partner: ESPN+

Seasons
- 2023 2024 (UFL)

The 2024 XFL season was the planned third season of the rebooted XFL and the second under its new ownership group of Dwayne Johnson, Dany Garcia, and Gerry Cardinale (RedBird Capital).

In September 2023, Axios reported that the XFL was in advanced talks with the USFL to merge the two leagues prior to the start of their 2024 seasons. On September 28, 2023, the USFL and XFL announced their intent to merge. In a separate statement, XFL President Russ Brandon indicated that league operations would continue unaffected until the deal closes and regulators approve the merger, and that all contracts with the league would be honored. On November 30, 2023, Garcia announced via her Instagram page that the leagues had received regulatory approval for the merger and were finalizing plans for a "combined season" to begin March 30, 2024.

The merger was formally announced on Fox NFL Sunday on December 31, 2023, with both leagues cancelling their planned season while surviving teams will play the 2024 season in the newly formed United Football League.

== Offseason ==
The Arlington Renegades defeated the DC Defenders in the 2023 XFL Championship Game to become the first league champions in this iteration of the XFL (after the 2020 XFL season was cut short due to the COVID-19 pandemic).

The league lost nearly $60 million during the season after spending approximately $140 million in expenses over the course of the 2023 season and earned $80 million in gross revenue, including roughly $20 million that came from its broadcast contract with ESPN. Executives with the league and ESPN indicated that they considered the season a success. After the season ended, the XFL made league wide cuts affecting up to 30 people, including two marketing executives, and shifted other employees to seasonal work. According to several reports, the XFL marketing budget was only $120,000 for the 2023 season.

More than 200 players who played in the 2023 XFL season earned invitations to workout for NFL teams, while 63 of them signed contracts. One player (Daniel Whelan) started the 2023 NFL season on an active 53-man NFL roster, while 17 other players started the season on practice squads.

During the 2023 season, XFL players filed a petition (through the United Steelworkers) for a representation election with Region 16 of the National Labor Relations Board, but decided against joining the union by vote of 124 to 73.

=== Merger with the USFL ===
On September 19, 2023, Axios reported that the XFL was in advanced talks with the USFL to create a "merger of equals" between the two leagues before the XFL 2024 season kicks off in February, with an agreement potentially announced by the end of the month. The USFL registered a trademark for "National Spring Football League," the name of the USFL's parent company but speculated to also be a name for the potential merged league, that was made public September 27. On September 28, the USFL and XFL announced their intent to merge with the specific details of the merger to be announced at a later date. The merger would also require regulatory approval. In October 2023 the XFL filed a trademark application for the name "United Football League," a name that founder Vince McMahon had previously registered in 2017 several years following the suspension of a previous league by that name. On November 30, 2023, the league chairwoman Dany Garcia announced via her Instagram page that they completed the antitrust review process to approve the leagues' merger, and the new league will begin its season on March 30, 2024. An end-of-year memo from league vice president Doug Whaley indicated that the league would again be based at a hub in Arlington, Texas and that training camps would begin on February 23, 2024. On December 31, The merger was formally announced and the name of the combined league was confirmed as the United Football League, with each component league surviving as a conference within the UFL.

== Teams ==
In a press gathering at the league's showcase in St. Louis, league president Russ Brandon confirmed that the league would remain at eight teams for the 2024 season. The league acknowledged on July 25, 2023, that renovations could render the Houston Roughnecks' home stadium in 2020 and 2023, TDECU Stadium, not available for the 2024 season but that the league would seek another stadium in Houston if that is the case and ruled out relocating the team out of the city. Following the merger, the UFL struck an agreement to use Rice University Stadium for a Houston franchise (which retains the Houston Roughnecks brand but the players and coaching staff of the former Houston Gamblers, who never played in Houston during their time in the 2020s incarnation of the USFL.)

On August 31, 2023, the Vegas Vipers announced that they would not return to Cashman Field for the 2024 season, citing widespread negative feedback from multiple sources about the venue.

Club	City	Stadium	Surface	Capacity†	Head coach
South Division
Arlington Renegades	Arlington, Texas	Choctaw Stadium	Grass	25,000	Bob Stoops
Houston Roughnecks	Houston, Texas	Rice Stadium	Turf	47,000†	Wade Phillips (reassigned to San Antonio 2024-01-01)
Orlando Guardians	Orlando, Florida	Camping World Stadium	Turf	60,219†	Terrell Buckley
San Antonio Brahmas	San Antonio, Texas	Alamodome	Turf	64,000†	Hines Ward (resigned 2023-12-28)
North Division
DC Defenders	Washington, D.C.	Audi Field	Grass	20,000	Reggie Barlow
Seattle Sea Dragons	Seattle, Washington	Lumen Field	Turf	68,740†	Jim Haslett
St. Louis Battlehawks	St. Louis, Missouri	The Dome at America's Center	Turf	67,277†	Anthony Becht
Vegas Vipers	Las Vegas, Nevada	TBA	TBA	TBA	Anthony Blevins

†Full stadium capacity. The large stadiums with multiple decks only open the lower bowl for XFL games, similar to the former AAF and MLS games played in large stadiums. The XFL has a target stadium size of 30,000 seats so that in the event of playoff games, the upper decks can be opened to increase capacity.

Locations of teams for the 2024 XFL season, (South Division - red; North Division - blue;)

== Players ==
For the 2024 season, the league would expand its rosters to 90-men rosters in the off-season (compared to 80-men rosters during the 2023 preseason) due to expected attrition, while every player will "have a NFL out-clause until the 16th week of the 2023 NFL season".

On March 20, 2023, the league announced it has named American National Combines (ANC) as the "official regional combines partner", with the ANC running a year-round scouting events, allowing the XFL to "identify more high-quality and talented players". The XFL hosted a series of player showcases across the United States in June and July, including:

- "HBCU Showcase" (June 17) at Clark Atlanta University.
- "XFL combine" (July 25–27) at Choctaw Stadium which was livestreamed on YouTube and Facebook. For the combine the XFL had partnerships with three companies - Catapult Sports, VALD Performance and Vitruve - for data breakdown.
- "Supplemental Showcase" (October 20) - in Orlando for players who are eligible to be selected at the XFL Supplemental Draft.
- "Specialist Showcase" (October 22) in partnership with Novak Kicking & Consulting at San Diego, California, featuring 76 players.

=== Draft ===
In an interview after the 2023 season, XFL's Senior Vice President of Player Personnel Doug Whaley disclosed that the league plans a "rookie" draft scheduled for June 16, 2023 and would conduct "multiple drafts" in the fall of 2023. The XFL Rookie Draft conducted on June 16, 2023, with 80 players being selected.

On July 28 the XFL held a "rights claim" draft, which had not been announced to the public, and the picks were later released through the official XFL transaction page. The players rights were assigned to the selected team, but they are not under contract with the team (similar to the "negotiation lists" in the CFL). The players selected included: Tavon Austin, Darrynton Evans, Chris Odom, Dru Samia, Josh Jackson, Darrell Henderson, Harrison Hand, Quinton Bell and Anthony Gordon.

As a result of the merger talks, the planned 2024 Draft (slated for October 4, 2023) was postponed to November and later cancelled.

=== Compensation ===
After the 2023 season concluded, Doug Whaley, XFL's Senior Vice President of Player Personnel, said in an interview that the league delaying contracts for 2024 season due to a potential unionization of players from "another entity" (not through the United Steelworkers). Russ Giglio, Senior Director, Player Administration and Officiating Operations, also mentioned that 2023 season players has a mutual 'opt-in' agreement: "The players that finish the season have a mutual option with the team to sign back. The team wants the player back, the player wants to come back, we’ll sign a contract".

On December 29, 2023 XFL players were notified by Whaley that their current contracts and health benefits would expire on December 31, 2023.

=== Player movement ===
Transactions

- Darnell Sankey asked to return to the CFL and granted his release on August 1, 2023, from Arlington Renegades.
- On July 31, 2023 Travis Rudolph signed with the Orlando Guardians after he was acquitted from murder charges.
- On August 9, 2023, the exclusive rights of 28 players who participate in the "XFL Combines" and "IFL to XFL Combine" were claimed by XFL teams. The claiming process is similar to the NFL's "futures contracts".
- On August 11, 2023 the Seattle Sea Dragons made a trade with St. Louis Battlehawks for LB Silas Kelly in exchange for TE Charlie Taumoepeau and a claim rights pick from the XFL Combine, while the Houston Roughnecks acquired WR Landen Akers from the San Antonio Brahmas for a claim rights pick.
- In October a total of 117 players signed letters of intent with XFL teams.

=== Partnerships ===
==== Indoor Football League ====
In July 2023, the league announced a "IFL to XFL Combine", which will give Indoor Football League exclusive opportunity to showcase their abilities in front of XFL coaches and directors of player development, and was part of the 2023 "IFL National Championship Weekend". "This is another step in our relationship with the XFL", said IFL commissioner Todd Tryon, "we are excited to continue to build with the XFL to create opportunities for players in both of these great leagues".

== Coaches ==
=== Coaching changes ===
Team	Departing coach	Incoming coach	Notes
Vegas Vipers	Rod Woodson	Anthony Blevins	On June 12, the XFL announced Sunday night that the Vegas Vipers and Woodson had mutually agreed to part ways and the Pro Football Hall of Famer will not return for the 2024 season. The Vipers finished the 2023 season with 2–8 record. Anthony Blevins was hired as his replacement on July 7. He had spent the previous five seasons as an assistant with the New York Giants and is an alumnus of the original XFL, having played for the Birmingham Thunderbolts in 2001.
San Antonio Brahmas	Hines Ward	Wade Phillips	On December 28, Ward departed the XFL in protest of the league's change to a seasonal contract structure. He accumulated a record of 3–7 as head coach of the Brahmas. Phillips, who had signed a guaranteed two-year contract with firmer protections than Ward's, had spent the 2023 season as head coach of the Houston Roughnecks; the USFL's Houston Gamblers were the surviving Houston team in the USFL/XFL merger but were granted the Roughnecks' brand, social media presence (which had more followers than the Gamblers'), and home city. As a result of the arrangement, Gamblers coach Curtis Johnson replaced Phillips as coach of the Roughnecks.

== Season structure ==
=== Postseason ===
After the 2023 season, XFL President Russ Brandon addressed the criticism revolving around the playoff format and the tie-breaker scenario: "We never thought we would get that far in the tie-breaker scenario (...) The key to anything is to keep things simple, so we'll have to clean that up (...) We'll evaluate the situation that happened this year with the playoff. looking back at it, more thought needs to go into it. that will be under review." Brandon also mentioned that the league reserved dates for the 2024 championship game at locations in "neutral" sites.

== League finances ==
In June, 2023 Forbes indicated that the league expects around $100 million in revenue for the 2024 season. XFL chairwoman Dany Garcia said: "We’re extremely well-capitalized for the long-term. This is our new WWE. The next massive live property".

=== Business partnerships ===
The league signed multi-year sponsorship deals with Progressive Corporation and Under Armour. In November 2023 Garcia and Johnson met with several U.S. senators trying to secure a sponsorship with the US military.

== Media ==
=== Broadcasting ===
This was going to be the second year of a five-year exclusive agreement with ESPN Inc. and the Walt Disney Company to carry every XFL game across ESPN's platforms, ABC, and FX. Worth between $100 million and $150 million. Some refute the idea and claimed that the XFL is not getting a rights fee from ESPN, and the agreement is a rights agreement for the games to be on the air, but without payment. In a tweet, Dwayne Johnson responded to the claimed and said: "ESPN is a stakeholder in XFL. Long term partners", implying that ESPN are shareholders in the league.

==== International broadcasters ====
In Latin America, the 2024 season will be televised by ESPN and its streaming and on-demand platform Star+.

== See also ==
- 2024 USFL (planned) season
- 2024 UFL season
