= 2025 DC Defenders season =

American professional football season

- Owner: Alpha Acquico, LLC
- General manager: Von Hutchins
- Head coach: Shannon Harris
- Home stadium: Audi Field

Results
- Record: 6–4
- Conference place: 2nd in XFL Conference
- Playoffs: Won Conference Finals (at Battlehawks) 36–18; Won UFL Championship (vs. Panthers) 58–34

Uniform

The 2025 DC Defenders season was the fourth season for the DC Defenders as a professional American football franchise and the second season in the United Football League (UFL). The Defenders played their home games at Audi Field and were led by interim head coach Shannon Harris. The Defenders won their first UFL championship, defeating Michigan Panthers, 58–34, in the 2025 UFL championship game.

In the offseason, quarterback Jordan Ta'amu re-signed for his third straight season with the Defenders. On March 22, 2025, head coach Reggie Barlow departed the Defenders and quarterback coach Shannon Harris took over in an interim role for the 2025 season. In week eight, the Defenders defeated Arlington 33–30, clinching their second postseason berth in franchise history and first since the 2023 season. Ta'amu rested the second half of week nine and all of game ten in preparation of the XFL conference championship against the St. Louis Battlehawks. After losing to Houston in week nine, backup quarterback Mike DiLiello received his first professional start in the season finale against St. Louis in heavy rainfall and the Defenders lost and finished the regular season 6–4. They split the regular season series with St. Louis. However, even if they won their final two games, they wouldn't have hosted the XFL Conference Championship Game due to a scheduling conflict.

In the XFL conference championship against St. Louis, the Defenders never trailed and won by a convincing score of 36–18. Ta'amu threw for 204 yards and a touchdown while running backs Deon Jackson and Abram Smith ran for a combined 180 yards and three touchdowns. Defensively, Malik Fisher had a game high two sacks while the Defenders had a total of five sacks and nine tackles for losses. This victory clinched their second championship game appearance in franchise history. The Defenders then faced the Panthers who they had lost to 14–38 in week six of the regular season.

Leading up to the championship game, quarterback Jordan Ta'amu was not selected for the All-UFL team, Offensive Player of the Year or Most Valuable Player. Ta'amu led the UFL with 17 touchdown passes despite missing the final game and a half of the season. In the 58–34 victory over the Panthers, Ta'amu was 21-of-28 for 390 yards and four touchdowns. He also ran for another score in a pivotal fourth-and-goal situation in the first half. For his performance he was named the games Most Valuable Player.

On the season, wide receiver Cornell Powell led the league with seven touchdown receptions. His counterpart Chris Rowland led the league with 1,070 All-purpose yards and was named All-UFL team for wide receiver and return specialist. Offensive lineman Yasir Durant was named All-UFL. Defensively, the Defenders had four players named All-UFL. This included lineman Joe Wallace and edge Derrick Roberson. Linebacker Anthony Hines and cornerback Deandre Baker rounded out the All-UFL list for the Defenders. In week eight against Arlington, Baker had a game ending interception that helped clinch a postseason berth.

Head coach Shannon Harris and Offensive Coordinator Fred Kaiss were selected for Coach of the Year and Assistant Coach of the Year. Through the 2025 season, the DC Defenders hold a 22–13 overall record, including a 10–10 record in two seasons of play in UFL.

== Roster ==
2025 DC Defenders final roster
Quarterbacks: 17 Mike DiLiello; 18 Spencer Sanders; 10 Jordan Ta'amu; Running backs: 28 Darius Hagans; 25 Deon Jackson; 4 Abram Smith; Wide receivers: 13 Javon Antonio; 3 Jaydon Mickens; 14 Cornell Powell; 12 Chris Rowland; 83 Braylon Sanders; 19 Ty Scott; 85 Seth Williams; Tight ends: 87 Ben Bresnahan; 84 Mason Fairchild; 88 Briley Moore	Offensive linemen: 56 Johari Branch G/C; 74 Gunner Britton T; 79 Tykeem Doss G; 70 Yasir Durant T; 77 Liam Fornadel G; 51 Mike Maietti C; 62 Jarrid Williams T; Defensive linemen: 7 Davin Bellamy DE; 92 Malik Fisher DE; 91 Dennis Johnson DT; 95 Devonnsha Maxwell DT; 48 Andre Mintze DE; 98 Kyle Phillips DE; 50 Derick Roberson DE; 90 Niles Scott DT; 99 Joseph Wallace DT	Linebackers: 45 Brian Abraham; 44 Micah Baskerville; 57 Anthony Hines; 11 MoMo Sanogo; 33 Shayne Simon; Defensive backs: 9 Deontay Anderson SS; 2 Deandre Baker CB; 21 Trey Dean SS; 23 Willie Drew CB; 8 Tayler Hawkins FS; 32 Isaiah Johnson FS; 27 Kelvin Joseph CB; 5 Michael Ojemudia CB; 24 Kiondre Thomas CB; 1 Bryce Thompson CB; Special teams: 80 Trae Barry LS; 47 Paxton Brooks P; 16 Matt McCrane K	Reserve lists: 75 Mason Brooks T (IR); -- Trenton Cannon RB Retired; 6 Ferrod Gardner LB (IR); 21 Montae Nicholson FS (IR); 26 Sam Kidd FS (IR); 50 active, 5 inactive

== Staff ==
DC Defenders staff
Front Office: General manager – Von Hutchins; Head Coach: Head coach – Shannon Harris; Offensive Coaches: Offensive coordinator/running backs – Fred Kaiss; Wide receivers – Andre Simmons; Offensive line/Run Game Coordinator – Brian Braswell	Defensive Coaches: Defensive coordinator – Blake Williams; Linebackers/special teams – Deion Harris; Defensive backs – Vernon Dean

== Draft ==
The UFL held its first draft since the creation of the league on July 17, 2024.

Rnd	Pick No.	Player	Pos.	College
1	4	Gottlieb Ayedze	OT	Maryland
2	12	Kedon Slovis	QB	BYU
3	20	Leonard Taylor III	DT	Miami (FL)
4	28	Garret Greenfield	OT	South Dakota State
5	36	Braiden McGregor	DE	Michigan
6	44	Michael Wiley	RB	Arizona
7	52	Dallas Gant	LB	Toledo
8	60	Curtis Jacobs	LB	Penn State
9	68	Tanner Mordecai	QB	Wisconsin
10	76	Omar Brown	S	Nebraska

== Schedule ==
All times Eastern

Week	Day	Date	Kickoff	TV	Opponent	Results		Location	Attendance
Week	Day	Date	Kickoff	TV	Opponent	Score	Record	Location	Attendance
1	Sunday	March 30	3:00 p.m.	ESPN	Birmingham Stallions	W 18–11	1–0	Audi Field	12,254
2	Saturday	April 5	8:00 p.m.	ABC	Memphis Showboats	W 17–12	2–0	Audi Field	13,142
3	Sunday	April 13	3:00 p.m.	ABC	at St. Louis Battlehawks	W 27–15	3–0	The Dome at America's Center	30,014
4	Sunday	April 20	5:00 p.m.	Fox	San Antonio Brahmas	L 18–24	3–1	Audi Field	12,474
5	Sunday	April 27	12:00 p.m.	ESPN	at Arlington Renegades	W 37–33	4–1	Choctaw Stadium	9,544
6	Sunday	May 4	12:00 p.m.	ESPN	at Michigan Panthers	L 14–38	4–2	Ford Field	11,653
7	Friday	May 9	8:00 p.m.	Fox	at San Antonio Brahmas	W 32–24	5–2	Alamodome	9,884
8	Sunday	May 18	12:00 p.m.	ABC	Arlington Renegades	W 33–30	6–2	Audi Field	14,638
9	Sunday	May 25	4:00 p.m.	Fox	at Houston Roughnecks	L 21–24	6–3	Space City Financial Stadium	6,684
10	Friday	May 30	8:00 p.m.	Fox	St. Louis Battlehawks	L 8–13	6–4	Audi Field	12,624

== Standings ==
2025 UFL standings
USFL Conference
Team	W	L	PCT	GB	TD+/-	TD+	TD-	DIV	PF	PA	DIFF	STK
(y) Birmingham Stallions	7	3	.700	–	8	28	20	5–1	244	167	77	W2
(x) Michigan Panthers	6	4	.600	1	8	30	22	3–3	245	198	47	L2
(e) Houston Roughnecks	5	5	.500	2	0	22	22	3–3	183	201	-18	W2
(e) Memphis Showboats	2	8	.200	5	-13	15	28	1–5	148	246	-98	L2
XFL Conference
Team	W	L	PCT	GB	TD+/-	TD+	TD-	DIV	PF	PA	DIFF	STK
(y) St. Louis Battlehawks	8	2	.800	–	7	26	19	4–2	231	163	68	W6
(x) DC Defenders	6	4	.600	2	3	28	25	4–2	225	224	1	L2
(e) Arlington Renegades	5	5	.500	3	4	23	19	3–3	229	168	61	W2
(e) San Antonio Brahmas	1	9	.100	7	-17	14	31	1–5	136	274	-138	L6
(x)–clinched playoff berth; (y)–clinched conference; (e)–eliminated from playoff contention

== Postseason ==
=== Schedule ===
Week	Day	Date	Kickoff	TV	Opponent	Results		Location	Attendance
Week	Day	Date	Kickoff	TV	Opponent	Score	Record	Location	Attendance
XFL Conference Championship	Sunday	June 8	6:00 p.m.	Fox	at St. Louis Battlehawks	W 36–18	1–0	The Dome at America's Center	27,589
UFL Championship	Saturday	June 14	8:00 p.m.	ABC	vs. Michigan Panthers	W 58–34	2–0	The Dome at America's Center	14,559
