= Fred Kaiss =

American football coach

DC Defenders
- Title: Offensive coordinator

Personal information
- Born: January 6, 1959 (age 67); Baltimore, Maryland, U.S.

Career information
- College: La Salle University

Career history
- Southwestern HS (MD) (1990–1991) Head coach; Morgan State (1992) Offensive coordinator/quarterbacks/wide receivers; Southern (1993–1996) Running backs/special teams; Tennessee State (1997–1999) Running backs & special teams; Alabama A&M (2000) Offensive coordinator/wide receivers; Hampton (2001–2005) Offensive coordinator/quarterbacks; Tennessee State (2006–2009) Offensive coordinator; Alabama State (2011–2014) Offensive coordinator; Alcorn State (2015–2017) Offensive coordinator; DC Defenders (2023–present) Offensive coordinator

Awards and highlights
- UFL champion (2025); UFL Assistant Coach of the Year (2025)

Fred Kaiss (born January 6, 1959) is an American football coach who is currently the offensive coordinator for the DC Defenders of the United Football League (UFL). He has previously served as offensive coordinator at Morgan State University, Alabama A&M University, Hampton University, Tennessee State University, Alabama State University, and Alcorn State University.

== Coaching career ==
=== Early career ===
Kaiss began coaching at Brooklyn Park High School and Andover High School, both in Maryland. In 1990, Kaiss was hired as the head coach of Southwestern High School in Baltimore. There he led a previously winless team to two straight winning seasons before leaving in 1992.

=== College career ===
In 1992, he was hired as the offensive coordinator, quarterback coach, and receivers coach at Morgan State University. In 1993, Keiss moved on to Southern University, where he served as running backs coach, recruiting coordinator, and special teams coordinator. There he won the Black College National Championship and SWAC Championship in 1993 and 1995. From 1997 to 1999, he served as special teams coordinator/wide receivers coach at Tennessee State University. In 2000, he became the offensive coordinator/receivers coach at Alabama A&M University.

In 2001, he became the offensive coordinator and quarterbacks coach at Hampton University. He spent five seasons as offensive coordinator there, winning back-to-back black national championships.

In 2006, he returned to Tennessee State, where he served as offensive coordinator. He also served as a regional recruiting coordinator.

In 2011, he was hired to be the offensive coordinator at Alabama State University. There he served under head coach Reggie Barlow. In 2015, the Hornets moved on from both Barlow and Kaiss.

From 2015 to 2017, he served as the offensive coordinator at Alcorn State University.

=== DC Defenders ===
In 2022, Kaiss was announced as the offensive coordinator of the DC Defenders of the XFL. He would reunite with former head coach Reggie Barlow, who he worked with at Alabama State University. In his first season, the Defenders finished with a league-best 9–1 record and appeared in the 2023 XFL Championship Game, losing 35–26 to the Arlington Renegades.

In 2025, Kaiss was named the UFL's Assistant Coach of the Year.
