= Shannon Harris =

American football coach (born 1980)

DC Defenders
- Title: Head coach

Personal information
- Born: August 30, 1980 (age 46); Wiggins, Mississippi, U.S.

Career information
- Position: Quarterback
- College: Tennessee State (2001–2002)
- NFL draft: 2003: undrafted

Career history
- Tennessee State (2003) Graduate assistant; Tennessee State (2004) Quarterbacks coach; Tennessee State (2005) Tight ends coach; Tennessee State (2006–2008) Wide receivers coach; Tennessee State (2009) Quarterbacks coach; Alabama State (2010–2014) Quarterbacks coach; Alcorn State (2015–2017) Wide receivers coach; Tennessee State (2018) Offensive analyst; Tennessee State (2019–2020) Offensive coordinator; Virginia State (2021) Offensive coordinator; Virginia State (2022) Interim head coach; DC Defenders (2023–2024) Quarterbacks coach; DC Defenders (2025–present) Head coach; Tennessee State (2025) Offensive coordinator/quarterbacks

Awards and highlights
- UFL champion (2025); UFL Coach of the Year (2025)

Head coaching record
- Regular season: 11–9 (.550)
- Postseason: 3–1 (.750)
- Career: 14–10 (.583)

Shannon Harris (born August 30, 1980) is an American professional football coach who is the head coach of the DC Defenders of the United Football League (UFL). He has also served as assistant college football coach for the Alabama State Hornets, Alcorn State Braves, and Virginia State Trojans. With the Defenders in 2025, Shannon won a UFL championship and was named the UFL Coach of the Year.

== Coaching career ==
=== HBCU ===
Harris began his coaching career in 2003, after playing two seasons with Tennessee State Tigers. Between 2004 and 2009, Harris was moved through various roles with the team. From 2010 to 2014, he was the wide receivers coach at Alabama State. From 2015 to 2017, he served as the wide receivers coach at Alcorn State. He returned back to Tennessee State for two seasons before being hired as the offensive coordinator at Virginia State. He was named the Interim head coach in late March 2022, a perfunctory promotion that lasted less than six weeks before Henry Frazier III was permanently hired in early May.

=== DC Defenders ===
Shannon was hired by the DC Defenders in 2023, where he served as the quarterbacks coach for the next two seasons.

Harris was named interim head coach on March 22, 2025, after Reggie Barlow departed the Defenders. Three days later, Barlow stated that Harris would be among the Defenders coaching staff joining him at Tennessee State. He clarified the next day that Harris would finish out the 2025 season in DC before he and the rest of the Defenders staff joined Barlow at Tennessee State. Harris guided the Defenders to a 6–4 record, culminating in a 58–34 victory over the Michigan Panthers in the 2025 UFL championship game. Harris was named the 2025 UFL coach of the year.

On July 23, 2025, Harris was named the full-time head coach of the Defenders. He will also serve as the offensive coordinator and quarterbacks coach at Tennessee State for the 2025 season.

== Head coaching record ==
UFL
| Team | Year | Regular Season | | | | | Postseason | | | |
| Team | Year | Won | Lost | Ties | Win % | Finish | Won | Lost | Win % | Result |
|---|---|---|---|---|---|---|---|---|---|---|
| DC | 2025 | 6 | 4 | 0 | .600 | 2nd in XFL Conference | 2 | 0 | 1.000 | UFL Champions |
| DC | 2026 | 5 | 5 | 0 | .500 | 4th | 1 | 1 | .500 | Lost UFL Championship |
| Total | | 11 | 9 | 0 | .550 | — | 3 | 1 | .750 | — |

== Records ==
=== UFL ===
- Most playoff wins by a head coach (3)
