= Paxton Brooks =

American football player (born 2000)

No. 47 – DC Defenders
- Position: Punter
- Roster status: Active

Personal information
- Born: February 21, 2000 (age 26); Lexington, South Carolina, U.S.
- Listed height: 6 ft 5 in (1.96 m)
- Listed weight: 203 lb (92 kg)

Career information
- High school: Airport High School (West Columbia, South Carolina)
- College: Tennessee (2018–2022)
- NFL draft: 2023: undrafted

Career history
- DC Defenders (2024–present)

Awards and highlights
- UFL champion (2025)

Paxton Brooks (born February 21, 2000) is an American football punter for the DC Defenders of the United Football League (UFL). He played college football at Tennessee.

== Professional career ==
Pre-draft measurables
Height	Weight	Arm length	Hand span	Wingspan
6 ft 5 1/4 in (1.96 m)	201 lb (91 kg)	31 1/2 in (0.80 m)	9 3/4 in (0.25 m)	6 ft 4 in (1.93 m)
All values from NFL Combine

Brooks was selected to the DC Defenders in the 2023 XFL rookie draft. He signed his letter of intent with the DC Defenders on October 19, 2023.
