= Jerod Kruse =

American football coach

Current position
- Title: Linebackers & Special Teams Coordinator
- Team: DC Defenders

Biographical details
- Born: Marysville, KS

Coaching career (HC unless noted)
- 2001–2006: Emporia State (PGC/DB)
- 2007: Baker (PGC/DB)
- 2008–2009: William Jewell (DC/LB)
- 2010–2014: William Jewell
- 2015: Southeastern Louisiana (AHC/DB/ST)
- 2016: Lee's Summit West HS (MO) (DC)
- 2017–2018: Cleveland Browns (Safeties/Asst. DB)
- 2019–2020: FIU Panthers football (co-DC/S)
- 2021–2022: Kansas City Chiefs (Advance Game Planning)
- 2023: Olathe West HS (KS) (AHC)
- 2024: Cleveland Browns (Research and Strategy Coach)
- 2025: Tennessee State (Special Teams & Secondary Coordinator)
- 2026–: DC Defenders (Linebackers & Special Teams Coordinator)

Head coaching record
- Overall: 18–36

Jerod Kruse (crew-zee) is an American football coach. He currently serves as the Linebackers and Special Teams coordinator for the DC Defenders of the United Football League (UFL). He previously spent multiple seasons working with the Cleveland Browns and Kansas City Chiefs of the National Football League (NFL). He was the co-defensive coordinator and defensive backs coach at Florida International University under head coach Butch Davis. He also has served as the safeties and assistant defensive backs coach for the Cleveland Browns in the National Football League (NFL). Kruse was the head football coach at William Jewell College from 2010 to 2014 Jerod was also an assistant coach at Emporia State University, Baker University, and Southeastern Louisiana University.

== Education ==
Between 1993 and 1996, Kruse played high school football and basketball for Marysville High School. He attended Coffeyville Community College after high school and earned an undergraduate and graduate degree from Emporia State University while playing football.

== Coaching career ==
From 2001 to 2006 Kruse was the secondary coach for Emporia State football program, and in 2007 Kruse was then the secondary coach for Baker University, in addition to serving as the university’s sports information director. Between 2008 and 2015, Kruse worked with Gregg Williams during the summer periods as a guest coach in the NFL for the New Orleans Saints and the St. Louis Rams. From 2010 to 2014, Kruse was the head football coach at William Jewell College (leading their transition from the NAIA to the NCAA Div II level). In 2014, he was named the Great Lakes Valley Conference Coach of the Year.

In 2015, Kruse was the associate head coach and special teams coordinator at Southeastern Louisiana University. In 2016, Kruse then worked as the defensive coordinator at Lee's Summit West High School in Lee's Summit, Missouri. In 2017 Kruse joined Williams full time with the Cleveland Browns, serving as the safeties and assistant defensive backs coach. In this role he has also been involved with coaching the team's special teams.

== Head coaching record ==
Year	Team	Overall	Conference	Standing	Bowl/playoffs
William Jewell Cardinals (Heart of America Athletic Conference) (2010)
2010	William Jewell	4–7	4–6	T–6th	
William Jewell Cardinals (NCAA Division II independent) (2011)
2011	William Jewell	4–6			
William Jewell Cardinals (Great Lakes Valley Conference) (2012–2014)
2012	William Jewell	2–9	1–7	8th	
2013	William Jewell	3–8	2–5	6th	
2014	William Jewell	5–6	5–3	T–2nd	GLVC Coach Of The Year
William Jewell:		18–36	12–21		
Total:		18–36			
