= Gareon Conley =

American football player (born 1995)

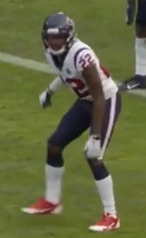
- Conley with the Houston Texans in 2019

No. 0 – DC Defenders
- Position: Cornerback
- Roster status: Active

Personal information
- Born: June 29, 1995 (age 31); Massillon, Ohio, U.S.
- Listed height: 6 ft 0 in (1.83 m)
- Listed weight: 190 lb (86 kg)

Career information
- High school: Massillon Washington
- College: Ohio State (2013–2016)
- NFL draft: 2017: 1st round, 24th overall pick

Career history
- Oakland Raiders (2017–2019); Houston Texans (2019–2020); DC Defenders (2024); Dallas Cowboys (2024)*; DC Defenders (2026–present)
- * Offseason or practice squad member only

Awards and highlights
- Second-team All-Big Ten (2016); CFP national champion (2014)

Career NFL statistics
- Total tackles: 94
- Pass deflections: 29
- Interceptions: 6
- Defensive touchdowns: 2
- Stats at Pro Football Reference

Gareon Conley (born June 29, 1995) is an American professional football cornerback for the DC Defenders of the United Football League (UFL). He played college football for the Ohio State Buckeyes and was selected by the Oakland Raiders in the first round of the 2017 NFL draft. He has also played for the Houston Texans of the National Football League (NFL).

== Early life ==
Conley attended Massillon Washington High School in Massillon, Ohio, where he played high school football. On defense, he was a cornerback, and on offense, he was a wide receiver. As a senior, he had 25 tackles and an interception on defense and 50 receptions and 16 touchdowns on offense. Conley originally committed to the University of Michigan to play college football but later changed his choice to Ohio State University.

== College career ==
After redshirting his first year at Ohio State in 2013, Conley played in all 15 games as a redshirt freshman in 2014, recording 16 tackles. He became a starter his sophomore year in 2015, starting all 13 games and finishing with 49 tackles and two interceptions. On November 29, 2016, Conley was named Second-team All-Big Ten Conference by the Coaches and Third-team by the media. After the 2016 season, Conley decided to forgo his senior year and enter the 2017 NFL draft.

== Professional career ==
=== Pre-draft ===
Conley received an invitation to the NFL Combine and completed all the combine and positional drills. He also participated at Ohio State's Pro Day, but chose to only perform positional drills for representatives and scouts in attendance. NFL Draft experts and analysts projected Conley to be selected in the first round. He was ranked the second best cornerback, behind Ohio State teammate Marshon Lattimore, by NFLDraftScout.com, ESPN, and NFL analyst Mike Mayock. He was also ranked the fourth best cornerback by Sports Illustrated.

Just days prior to the 2017 NFL draft, a woman accused Conley of rape, claiming it had occurred earlier in the month in a hotel room in Cleveland. Conley, in a statement, strongly denied the allegations. It was speculated he may fall out of the first round of the draft due to the sexual assault claims. A grand jury ruled not to charge Conley on July 31, 2017. Later, the woman filed a civil lawsuit against Conley, and Conley took the unusual step of filing a counterclaim against her for malicious prosecution. The civil case ultimately went to trial in Cleveland, Ohio, and the jury unanimously found that Conley was not liable to the woman for sexual assault, and also ordered her to pay Conley $300 for malicious prosecution (the amount requested by his attorney, John Camillus).

Pre-draft measurables
Height	Weight	Arm length	Hand span	Wingspan	40-yard dash	10-yard split	20-yard split	20-yard shuttle	Three-cone drill	Vertical jump	Broad jump	Bench press
6 ft 0 in (1.83 m)	195 lb (88 kg)	33 in (0.84 m)	9 1/2 in (0.24 m)	6 ft 4 in (1.93 m)	4.44 s	1.53 s	2.58 s	4.18 s	6.68 s	37 in (0.94 m)	10 ft 9 in (3.28 m)	11 reps
All values from NFL Combine

=== Oakland Raiders ===
==== 2017 ====
The Oakland Raiders selected Conley in the first round (24th overall) of the draft. The Raiders conducted their own investigation and administered a polygraph test to Conley. They chose to select him after he passed the polygraph test. On July 28, 2017, Conley signed a four-year deal worth $10.467 million featuring a $5.752 million signing bonus. He missed the season opener against the Titans due to a shin injury but returned in Weeks 2 and 3 before aggravating the shin injury. He was inactive for the next six games before eventually being placed on injured reserve on November 13.

==== 2018 ====
In Week 4 of the 2018 season, against the Cleveland Browns, Conley recorded a 36-yard pick-six off of Baker Mayfield for his first professional touchdown. In week 11 against the Arizona Cardinals, Conley intercepted Josh Rosen's first pass of the game; the Raiders eventually won 23-21. In week 15 against the Cincinnati Bengals, Conley suffered a concussion in the third quarter and was forced to miss the rest of the game as well as the following week's game against the Denver Broncos. In the beginning of the season, Conley struggled in coverage and was a liability when tackling. He was eventually benched, but made vast improvements when he returned to the starting lineup. During the second half of the season, Conley established himself as a shutdown cornerback. He held Tyreek Hill of the Kansas City Chiefs to 1 catch for 13 yards in week 13 and held Antonio Brown of the Pittsburgh Steelers to 5 catches for 35 yards the following week. Raiders head coach Jon Gruden stated that "He’s a lot more confident now," and former Raiders cornerback Lester Hayes said, “That boy can play.” Conley finished the season with 37 tackles, 15 passes defended, and 3 interceptions, including 1 pick six. He received an overall grade of 64.0 from Pro Football Focus in 2018, which ranked as the 68th highest grade among all qualifying corner backs.

==== 2019 ====
In week 1 against the Broncos, Conley made 4 tackles before suffering a neck injury when teammate Johnathan Abram's leg hit him on the top of his helmet. Conley had to be taken off the field with a stretcher and as he was being carted off the field, he was able to give a thumbs up. He was later hospitalized, but was released from the hospital the same day. In Week 5 against the Chicago Bears, Conley recorded an interception off Chase Daniel late in the fourth quarter which sealed a 24–21 win.

=== Houston Texans ===
On October 21, 2019, Conley was traded to the Houston Texans in exchange for a third round selection in the 2020 NFL draft that was originally acquired from the Seattle Seahawks in the Jadeveon Clowney trade. Conley made his debut with the Texans in Week 8 against his former team, the Oakland Raiders. In the game, Conley recorded 4 tackles as the Texans won 27–24.

In the divisional round of the playoffs against the Kansas City Chiefs, Conley recorded five tackles and sacked quarterback Patrick Mahomes once during the 51–31 loss.

On April 29, 2020, the Texans declined the option on Conley's contract, making him a free agent in 2021. He was placed on the active/physically unable to perform list at the start of training camp on July 31. Conley was activated on August 10. He was placed on injured reserve on September 7.

=== DC Defenders (first stint) ===
On December 26, 2023, Conley signed with the DC Defenders of the United Football League (UFL). His contract was terminated on June 18, 2024, to allow him to sign with an NFL team.

=== Dallas Cowboys ===
On June 18, 2024, Conley signed with the Dallas Cowboys. On July 28, Conley was released by Dallas, after which he announced his retirement from football.

=== DC Defenders (second stint) ===
On February 1, 2026, Conley came out of retirement and signed with the DC Defenders of the United Football League (UFL).
