= KJ Sails =

American football player (born 1997)

Profile
- Position: Cornerback

Personal information
- Born: May 2, 1997 (age 29); Tampa, Florida, U.S.
- Listed height: 5 ft 11 in (1.80 m)
- Listed weight: 180 lb (82 kg)

Career information
- High school: East Bay (Gibsonton, Florida)
- College: North Carolina (2016-2018); South Florida (2019-2020)
- NFL draft: 2021: undrafted

Career history
- Los Angeles Chargers (2021)*; Calgary Stampeders (2022)*; DC Defenders (2023)
- * Offseason or practice squad member only

Awards and highlights
- American Athletic All-Conference Second Team (2019); PFF All-American (2019)

KJ Sails (born May 2, 1997) is an American professional football player who is a free agent cornerback. He played college football at North Carolina and South Florida, and has also played for the Los Angeles Chargers of the National Football League (NFL).

== College career ==
=== North Carolina ===
Sails was member of the Tar Heels from 2016 to 2018, where he played in 19 games with 40 career tackles and 15 passes defended. He played in three games as a true freshman and a career-most 12 games during his sophomore season where he recorded 30 tackles and 16 pass breakups.

=== South Florida ===
On May 4, 2019, Sails announced he was transferring to South Florida. In 2019, Sails was named to American Athletic All-Conference Second Team, while started all 12 games at cornerback. He recorded 42 tackles on the year, and 5th in the ACC in Interceptions with 3. In 2020, Sails appeared in 9 games while recording 22 tackles on the season. He was invited to the East-West Shrine Bowl and the NFLPA Collegiate Bowl.

== Professional career ==
=== Los Angeles Chargers ===
After going undrafted in the 2021 NFL draft, Sails signed with the Los Angeles Chargers on August 7, 2021. He was released on August 29, 2021.

=== Calgary Stampeders ===
Sails signed with the Calgary Stampeders of the Canadian Football League (CFL) on February 1, 2022. He was released on May 14, 2022.

=== DC Defenders ===
On November 15, 2022, Sails was drafted by the DC Defenders of the XFL. He was not part of the roster after the 2024 UFL dispersal draft on January 15, 2024.
