= Southwestern Senior High School (Maryland) =

Location
- 200 Font Hill Avenue; Baltimore, Maryland 21223
- Coordinates: 39°17′4″N 76°39′51″W

Information
- School type: Public, Defunct, Comprehensive
- Founded: 1971
- Closed: 2007
- School district: Baltimore City Public Schools
- School number: 412
- Grades: 9-12
- Area: Urban
- Team name: Sabers

Southwestern Senior High School was a public high school located in Baltimore, Maryland. The school opened in September 1971 and closed in June 2007. The building was vacant for a year before the city leased it to the SEED School of Maryland boarding school. The main classroom building was torn down along with the library and cafeteria. The building has been replaced with dorms and portable classrooms.

== Notable staff and students ==
- Jack L. Chalker, novelist, taught at this school until 1978, when he left to write full-time
- Ruff Endz band members David Chance and Dante Jordan
