= Jason Bean =

Jason Bean may refer to:

- Jason Bean (politician), American politician and farmer, member of the Missouri Senate since 2022
- Jason Bean (American football) (born 1999), quarterback for the Indianapolis Colts
