= DC Defenders =

American football team based in Washington, D.C.

- Current season
Logo	Wordmark
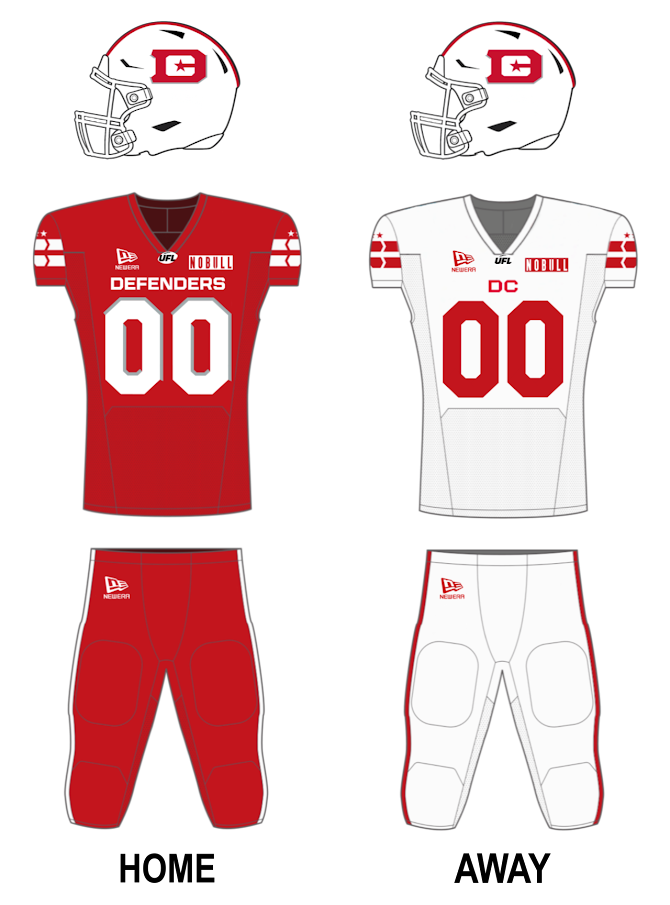
- Uniforms

General information
- Founded: December 5, 2018; 7 years ago
- Stadium: Audi Field; Washington, D.C.
- Colors: Red, white
- Mascot: Monty
- Website: www.theufl.com/teams/dc

Personnel
- Owner: League owned
- Head coach: Shannon Harris

Team history
- DC Defenders (2020–present)

Home fields
- Audi Field (2020, 2023–present)

League / conference affiliations
- XFL (2020–2023): East Division (2020); North Division (2023); United Football League (2024–present): XFL Conference (2024–2025)

Championships
- League championships: 1: UFL championships: 2025
- Conference championships: 1: XFL: 2025
- Division championships: 1: XFL North: 2023

Playoff appearances (3)
- XFL: 2023; UFL: 2025, 2026

The DC Defenders are a professional American football team based in Washington, D.C. The Defenders compete in the United Football League (UFL). The team was founded by Vince McMahon's Alpha Entertainment and is owned and operated by a consortium led by Mike Repole. The Defenders play their home games at Audi Field. The team won the UFL championship in 2025.

== History ==
=== McMahon era (2020) ===
On December 5, 2018, Washington, D.C., was announced as one of eight cities that would join the newly reformed XFL, as well as Seattle, Houston, Los Angeles, New York, St. Louis, Tampa Bay, and Dallas. On February 21, 2019, the team hired Pep Hamilton, who was most recently an assistant with the Michigan Wolverines football team, as its first head coach and general manager. The team name and logo were revealed on August 21, 2019, followed by the uniforms on December 3, 2019.

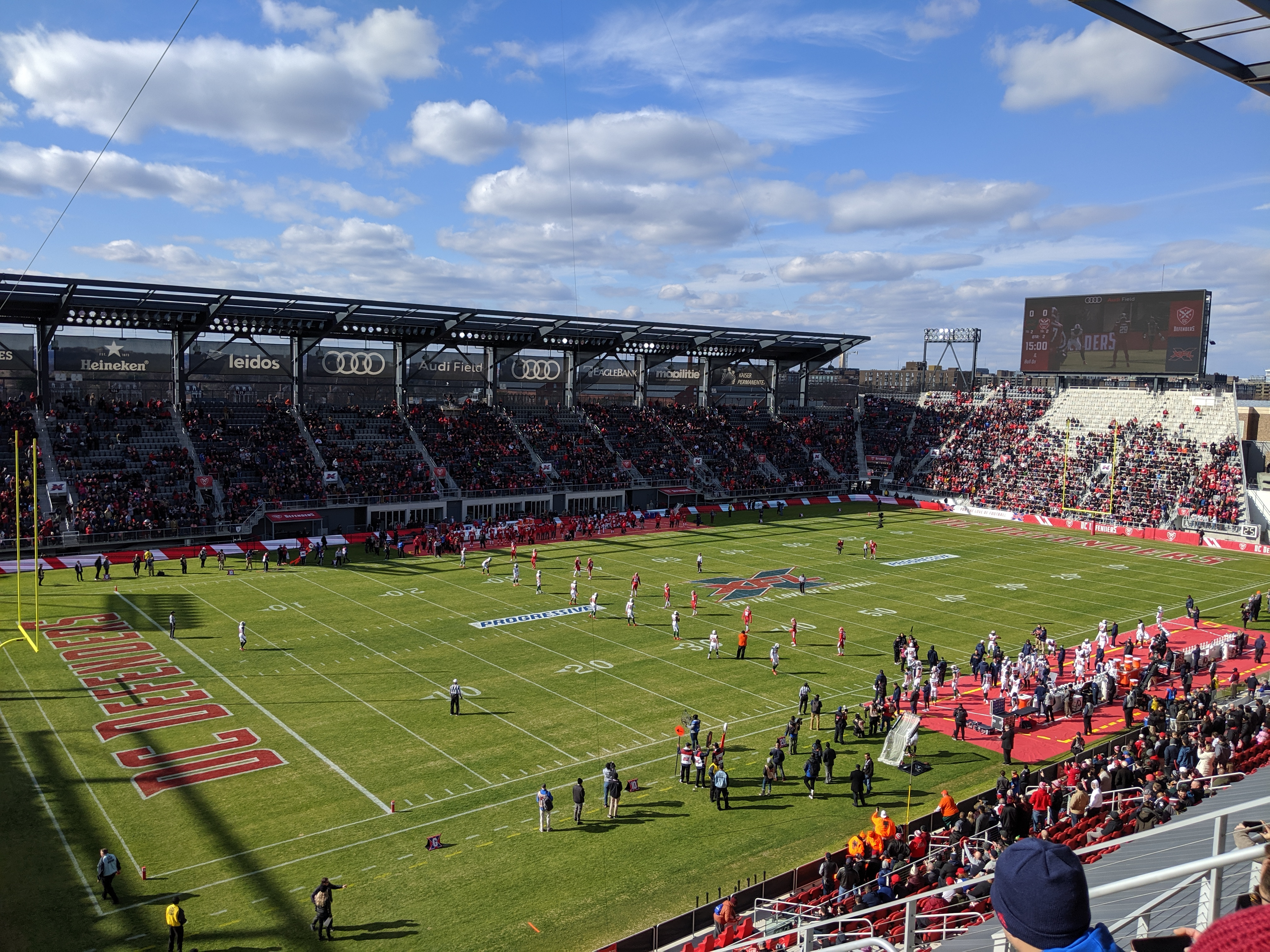
First ever XFL kickoff against the Seattle Dragons at Audi Field, in 2020

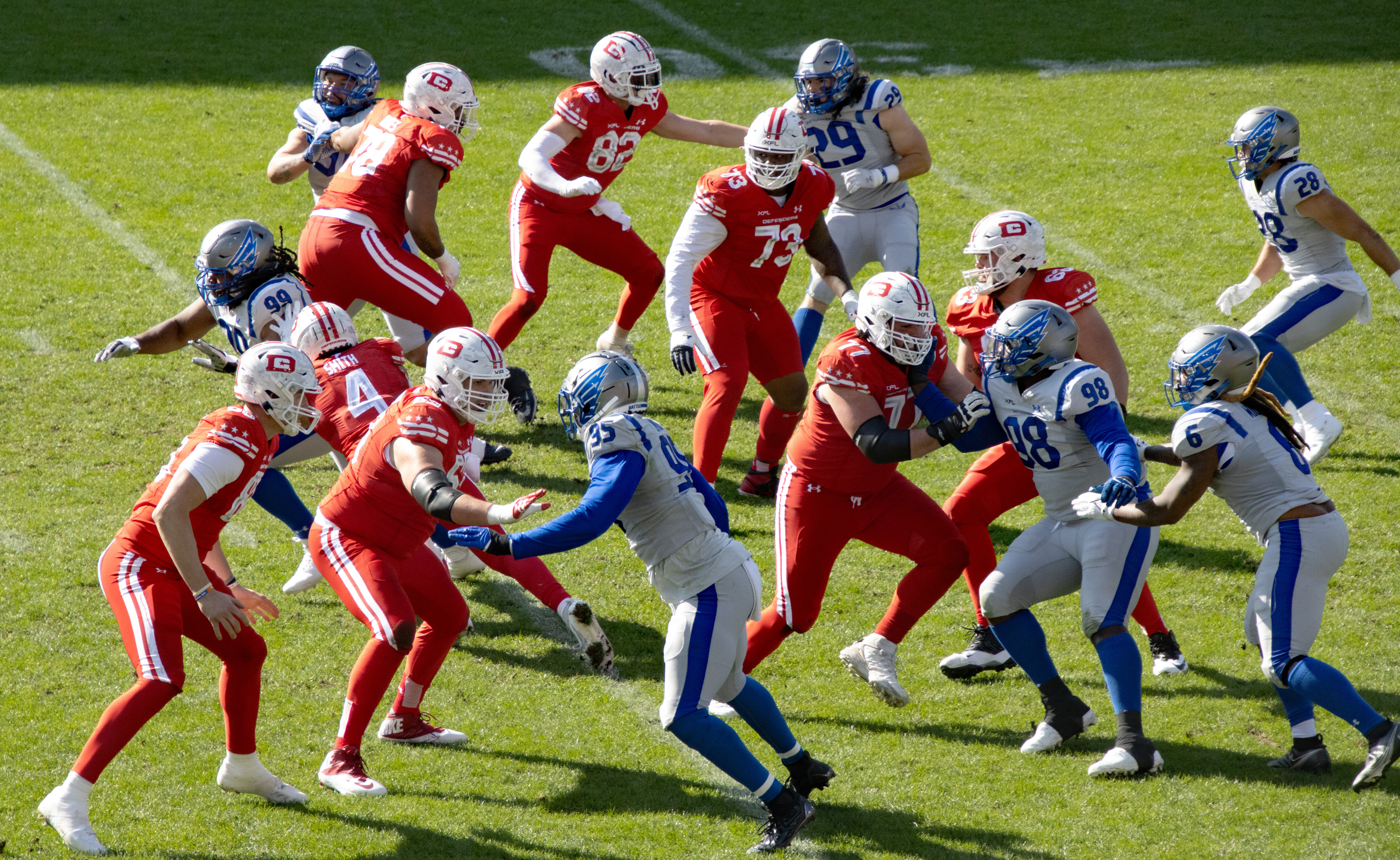
DC hosting the St. Louis BattleHawks at Audi Field, in 2023

Former logo for the DC Defenders used in 2020

On October 15, 2019, the Defenders announced their first player in team history, being assigned former Ohio State Buckeyes quarterback Cardale Jones. Later that day, the 2020 XFL draft took place. The Defenders selected wide receiver Rashard Davis with the first overall pick, but he did not play for the team and later signed with the Tennessee Titans.

On February 8, 2020, the Defenders won the first game in modern XFL history, defeating the Seattle Dragons by a score of 31–19. On February 15, 2020, the Defenders beat the New York Guardians by a score of 27–0, which was the first shutout in modern XFL history. On March 12, 2020, the XFL announced that the remainder of the 2020 XFL season had been cancelled due to the COVID-19 pandemic. On April 10, 2020, the XFL suspended operations and terminated all employees, players, and staff.

=== Dwayne Johnson and Dany Garcia era (2023–present) ===
On August 3, 2020, it was reported that a consortium led by Dwayne "The Rock" Johnson, Dany Garcia, and Gerry Cardinale (through Cardinale's fund RedBird Capital Partners) purchased the XFL for $15 million just hours before an auction could take place; the purchase received court approval on August 7, 2020. In March 2022, a report emerged that Reggie Barlow would become the new head coach of the D.C. XFL franchise, confirming that Washington, D.C., would return as an XFL city. Barlow's hire was official on April 13, 2022, as well as the return of the D.C. franchise on July 24, 2022. On October 31, 2022, the XFL announced that the Defenders name would be returning, this time with a brand new logo.

In September 2023, Axios reported that the XFL was in advanced talks with the USFL to merge the two leagues prior to the start of their 2024 seasons. On September 28, 2023, the XFL and USFL announced their intent to merge with details surrounding the merger to be announced at a later date. The merger would also require regulatory approval. In October 2023 the XFL filed a trademark application for the name "United Football League". On November 30, 2023, Garcia announced via her Instagram page that the leagues had received regulatory approval for the merger and were finalizing plans for a "combined season" to begin March 30, 2024. The merger was made official on December 31, 2023.

On March 22, 2025, head coach Reggie Barlow departed the Defenders and quarterback coach Shannon Harris took over in an interim role for the 2025 season. Three days later, Harris also appeared to resign to join Barlow at Tennessee State but later clarified that such a change would not take place until at least the end of the season. Harris would be named UFL Coach of the Year after leading the team to a 6–4 record, culminating in a 58–34 victory over the Michigan Panthers in the 2025 UFL championship game. Harris accepted the DC head coaching position permanently on July 23; he will join Tennessee State's staff for the 2025 season and will return to DC for 2026.

== Current roster ==
=== Players ===
DC Defenders roster
Quarterbacks (QB): 12 Jason Bean; 10 Jordan Ta'amu; Running backs (RB): 4 Abram Smith; 24 Xazavian Valladay; Wide receivers (WR): -- Jahcour Pearson; 3 Braylon Sanders; 19 Ty Scott; 11 Seth Williams; Tight ends (TE): 84 Mason Fairchild; 88 Briley Moore	Offensive linemen (OL): 56 Johari Branch RG; 79 Tykeem Doss LG; 71 Jaelyn Duncan LT; 70 Yasir Durant LT; 68 Steven Losoya III RG; 51 Mike Maietti C; Defensive linemen (DL): 45 Brian Abraham DE; 91 Dennis Johnson DT; 50 Derick Roberson DE; 7 Joe Wallace DT	Linebackers (LB): 43 Macklin Ayers ILB; 44 Micah Baskerville ILB; 57 Anthony Hines III ILB; 40 Brandon Smith ILB; Defensive backs (DB): 2 Deandre Baker CB; 0 Gareon Conley CB; 22 Willie Drew CB; 17 Kai Gray SS; 20 Azizi Hearn CB; 26 Sam Kidd SS; 21 Gabe Taylor CB; 1 Bryce Thompson CB; Special teams (ST): 47 Paxton Brooks P; 16 Matt McCrane K	36 active As of November 12, 2026. Rookies in italics.: Roster

== Staff ==
DC Defenders staff
Head coach: Head coach – Shannon Harris; Offensive coaches: Offensive coordinator – Fred Kaiss; Quarterbacks – Davis Johnson; Wide receivers – Andre Simmons; Offensive line – Brian Braswell	Defensive coaches: Defensive coordinator – Blake Williams; Linebackers/special teams – Jerod Kruse; Defensive backs – Vernon Dean

== Player history ==
=== Current NFL players ===
Season	Pos	Name	NFL team
2020	CB	Elijah Campbell	New York Giants
2023	P	Daniel Whelan	Green Bay Packers
2023	WR	Chris Blair	Atlanta Falcons
2023–2024	WR	Brandon Smith	Pittsburgh Steelers

=== Notable players ===
Season	Pos	Name	Notes
2020	QB	Cardale Jones	Former Ohio State Buckeyes quarterback
2020	WR	Eli Rogers	Former Pittsburgh Steelers wide receiver
2020	S	Matt Elam	Former Baltimore Ravens safety, 2013 1st round pick
2020	S	Rahim Moore	Former Denver Broncos safety, 2011 2nd round pick
2024	WR	Preston Williams	Former Miami Dolphins wide receiver
2024	LB	Jordan Evans	Former Cincinnati Bengals linebacker, 2017 6th round pick
2023–2024	S	D. J. Swearinger	Former Houston Texans safety, 2013 2nd round pick
2023–2025	S	Montae Nicholson	Former Washington Redskins safety, 2017 4th round pick
2024–present	CB	Gareon Conley	Former Oakland Raiders cornerback, 2016 1st round pick
2024–present	CB	Deandre Baker	Former New York Giants cornerback, 2019 1st round pick
2024–present	WR	Keke Coutee	Former Houston Texans wide receiver, 2018 4th round pick
2025	WR	Lynn Bowden	Former New Orleans Saints wide receiver, 2020 3rd round pick
2025	WR	Jaydon Mickens	Former Tampa Bay Buccaneers wide receiver
2025	CB	Kelvin Joseph	Former Dallas Cowboys cornerback, 2021 2nd round pick
2025	OT	D. J. Fluker	Former Los Angeles Chargers offensive tackle, 2013 1st round pick
2026–present	DE	Boogie Basham	Former Buffalo Bills defensive end, 2021 2nd round pick

=== XFL Offensive Player of the Year award winners ===
Defenders XFL OPOY winners
Year	Player	Position	Selector
2023	Jordan Ta'amu	QB	XFL

=== UFL Championship MVP award winners ===
Defenders UFL Championship MVP winners
Year	Player	Position	Selector
2025	Jordan Ta'amu	QB	UFL

== Coach history ==
=== Head coaches ===
#	Coach	Term	Regular season				Playoffs			Awards
#	Coach	Term	GC	W	L	Win %	GC	W	L	Awards
DC Defenders
1	Pep Hamilton	2020	5	3	2	.600	–	–	–	
2	Reggie Barlow	2023–2024	20	13	7	.650	2	1	1	2023 XFL Coach of the Year
3	Shannon Harris	2025–present	20	11	9	.550	4	3	1	2025 UFL Coach of the Year

=== Offensive coordinators ===
#	Coach	Term	Regular season				Playoffs			Awards
#	Coach	Term	GC	W	L	Win %	GC	W	L	Awards
DC Defenders
1	Tanner Engstrand	2020	5	3	2	.600	–	–	–	
2	Fred Kaiss	2023–present	40	24	16	.600	6	4	2	2025 UFL Assistant Coach of the Year

=== Defensive coordinators ===
#	Coach	Term	Regular season				Playoffs			Awards
#	Coach	Term	GC	W	L	Win %	GC	W	L	Awards
DC Defenders
1	Jeff FitzGerald	2020	–	–	–	–	–	–	–	
2	Louie Cioffi	2020	5	3	2	.600	–	–	–	
3	Gregg Williams	2023–2025	22	15	7	.612	2	1	1	
4	Blake Williams	2025–present	18	9	9	.500	4	3	1	

== Championships ==
=== North Division championship games ===
Year	Coach	Stadium	Location	Opponent	Score	Record
2023	Reggie Barlow	Audi Field	Washington, D.C.	Seattle Sea Dragons	37–21	9–1
Total North Division championship games won:						1

=== XFL Conference championship games ===
Year	Coach	Stadium	Location	Opponent	Score	Record
2025	Shannon Harris	The Dome at America's Center	St. Louis, Missouri	St. Louis Battlehawks	36–18	6–4
Total XFL Conference championship games won:						1

=== UFL championship games ===
Year	Coach	Stadium	Location	Opponent	Score	Record
2025	Shannon Harris	The Dome at America's Center	St. Louis, Missouri	Michigan Panthers	58–34	6–4
Total UFL championship games won:						1

== Rivalries ==
=== St. Louis Battlehawks ===
The Defenders' main rivalry is against the St. Louis Battlehawks. At the end of their first meeting of the 2023 season, three players were ejected after a brawl broke out. A week later, the Battlehawks' quarterback, A. J. McCarron, called their competition the "first XFL rivalry." DC leads the overall series 6–3 and leads the playoff series 1–0.

=== Arlington/Dallas Renegades ===
The Defenders also have a rivalry with the Arlington/Dallas Renegades. The rivalry stems from the two teams being founded in the 2020 iteration of the XFL and both being members of the UFL's XFL Conference, as well as there being a Dallas/Washington rivalry in the NFL. The rivalry picked up steam when the Renegades upset DC in the 2023 XFL Championship Game. DC leads the overall series 5–2 while the Renegades lead the playoff series 1–0.

=== Franchise matchup history ===
Team	Record	Pct.
Birmingham Stallions	2–1	.667
Columbus Aviators	1–0	1.000
Dallas Renegades	6–2	.750
Houston Gamblers	2–1	.667
Houston Roughnecks	1–0	1.000
Los Angeles Wildcats	0–1	.000
Louisville Kings	0–3	.000
Memphis Showboats	2–0	1.000
Michigan Panthers	1–2	.333
Orlando Guardians	1–1	.500
Orlando Storm	1–2	.333
San Antonio Brahmas	3–2	.600
Seattle Sea Dragons	4–0	1.000
St. Louis Battlehawks	6–4	.600
Vegas Vipers	2–1	.667

- Defunct teams in light gray.

== Season-by-season record ==
UFL champions^{†} (2024–present)	XFL champions^{§} (2023)	Conference champions^{*}	Division champions^{^}	Wild Card berth^{#}

Season	Team	League	Conference	Division	Regular season			Postseason results	Awards	Head coaches	Pct.
Season	Team	League	Conference	Division	Finish	W	L	Postseason results	Awards	Head coaches	Pct.
2020	2020	XFL	—N/a	East	1st	3	2	Season Suspended after 5 games due to COVID-19		Pep Hamilton	.600
2021	—										
2022	—										
2023	2023	XFL	—N/a	North ^{^}	1st ^{#}	9	1	Won Division Finals (Sea Dragons) 37–21; Lost XFL Championship (vs. Renegades) 26–35	Jordan Ta'amu (OPOY); Reggie Barlow (COTY)	Reggie Barlow	.650
2024	2024	UFL	XFL	—N/a	3rd	4	6			Reggie Barlow	.650
2025	2025	UFL ^{†}	XFL ^{*}	—N/a	2nd ^{#}	6	4	Won XFL Conference Championship (at Battlehawks) 36–18; Won UFL Championship (vs. Panthers) 58–34	Shannon Harris (COTY); Fred Kaiss (ACOTY)	Shannon Harris	.550
2026	2026	UFL	—N/a	—N/a	4th ^{#}	5	5	Won Semifinals (at Storm) 28–22; Lost United Bowl (vs. Kings) 20–27		Shannon Harris	.550
Total						27	18	All-time regular season record (2020–2026)			.600
Total						4	2	All-time postseason record (2020–2026)			.667
Total						30	20	All-time regular season and postseason record (2020–2026)			.600

== Records ==
All-time Defenders leaders
Leader	Player	Record	Years with Defenders
Passing yards	Jordan Ta'amu	7,400 passing yards	2023–present
Passing touchdowns	Jordan Ta'amu	60 passing touchdowns	2023–present
Rushing yards	Abram Smith	1,352 rushing yards	2023–present
Rushing touchdowns	Deon Jackson	11 rushing touchdowns	2025–present
Receiving yards	Ty Scott	981 receiving yards	2024–present
Receiving touchdowns	Ty Scott	9 receiving touchdowns	2024–present
Receptions	Cornell Powell	63 receptions	2025–present
Tackles	Anthony Hines III	151 tackles	2023–present
Sacks	Derick Roberson	18 sacks	2024–present
Interceptions	Michael Joseph; Gareon Conley	4 interceptions	2023–2024; 2024–present
Coaching wins	Reggie Barlow	13 wins	2023–2024

=== Starting quarterbacks ===
Regular season – As of June 14, 2026

Season(s)	Quarterback(s)	Notes	Ref
2020	Cardale Jones (3–2)		
2021–2022	Suspended operations		
2023	Jordan Ta'amu (9–1)		
2024	Jordan Ta'amu (4–6)		
2025	Jordan Ta'amu (6–3) / Mike DiLiello (0–1)		
2026	Jordan Ta'amu (5–3) / Spencer Sanders (0–1) / Jason Bean (0–1)		

Postseason

Season(s)	Quarterback(s)	Notes	Ref
2023	Jordan Ta'amu (1–1)		
2025	Jordan Ta'amu (2–0)	Ta'amu won UFL Championship Game MVP	
2026	Jason Bean (1-1)		

Most games as starting quarterback

Name	Period	GP	GS	W	L	Pct
Jordan Ta'amu	2023–2026	35	35	24	13	.649
Cardale Jones	2020	5	5	3	2	.600
Mike DiLiello	2024–2026	8	1	0	1	.000
Spencer Sanders	2025-2026	4	1	0	1	.000
Jason Bean	2026	1	1	0	1	.000

=== Year by year ===
Season	Head Coach	League	Avg. Crowd	Home Record
2020	Pep Hamilton	XFL	16,179	3–0
2023	Reggie Barlow	XFL	14,269	5–0
2024	Reggie Barlow	UFL	14,143	2–3
2025	Shannon Harris	UFL	13,026	3–2
2026	Shannon Harris	UFL	9,000	3–2

== Market overview ==
The Baltimore–Washington area has a history of several teams in alternative professional football. The USFL had the Washington Federals (a mostly unsuccessful franchise) in its first two years. Then the Philadelphia/Baltimore Stars moved from Veterans Stadium in Philadelphia, Pennsylvania, to Byrd Stadium in College Park, Maryland, in 1985, winning the USFL's final championship. The Canadian Football League's Baltimore CFL Colts/Stallions were the only successful American team in the league during their two-year existence in the mid-1990s (and were the only American-based team to win the Grey Cup, the CFL's championship). Indoor teams to have played in Washington include the Washington Commandos and the Washington Valor (which folded two months before the Defenders' first game) of the Arena Football League, and the D.C. Armor of American Indoor Football Association, in addition to several teams based in Maryland.

The Defenders join the Washington Commanders, Washington Nationals, Washington Capitals, Washington Wizards, Washington Mystics, D.C. United, Washington Spirit, Capital City Go-Go, and Old Glory DC as professional sports teams based in the Washington, D.C., metropolitan area.

Defenders fans have taken up a tradition of assembling beer snakes out of empty beer containers. The snake constructed at the March 8, 2020, game vs the St. Louis Battlehawks ended up spanning several rows, including a contribution from then-Commissioner Oliver Luck.

In the 2023 season opener against the Seattle Sea Dragons, fans threw lemons onto the field after stadium security personnel confiscated several attempts at making a beer snake, delaying the game for a few minutes. This prompted the Defenders to discuss the issue with Audi Field security and set new guidelines that allowed the beer snake to return during the next home game on March 5.

Despite playing in the UFL's smallest stadium by capacity, the Defenders have the second-highest attendance in the league as of 2024, regularly playing to at-capacity or near-capacity crowds at Audi Field.

== See also ==
- Sports in Washington, D.C.
