= 2023 DC Defenders season =

American professional football season

- Owner: Alpha Acquico, LLC
- General manager: Reggie Barlow
- Head coach: Reggie Barlow
- Home stadium: Audi Field

Results
- Record: 9–1
- Division place: 1st XFL North
- Playoffs: Won Division Finals (vs. Sea Dragons) 37–21; Lost XFL Championship (vs. Renegades) 26–35

The 2023 DC Defenders season was the second season for the DC Defenders as a professional American football franchise. The Defenders played their home games at Audi Field and were led by head coach Reggie Barlow.

At the first home game security staff prevented fans building the "Beer Snake", a signature feature from the 2020 season, and fans started throwing lemons on the field. The league made the proper arrangements for the "Beer Snake" to be allowed during Defenders home games.

Earning their first playoff berth and clinching first place in the North Division, the Defenders eliminated the Seattle Sea Dragons in the North Division title game in the playoffs. With the win, the Defenders advanced to the XFL Championship Game where they faced the Arlington Renegades, losing by a score of 26-35.

== Roster ==
2023 DC Defenders final roster
Quarterbacks: 2 Geremy Hickbottom; 3 D'Eriq King; 10 Jordan Ta'amu; Running backs: 14 Cam'Ron Harris; 4 Abram Smith; 13 Pooka Williams; Wide receivers: 1 Chris Blair; 8 Jazz Ferguson; 0 Josh Hammond; 11 Lucky Jackson; 16 Brandon Smith; Tight ends: 18 Alex Ellis; 88 Briley Moore; 82 Ethan Wolf	Offensive linemen: 62 Tommy Champion T; 66 Ty Clary C/G; 77 Liam Fornadel G; 78 D'Marcus Hayes T; 53 Kyle Murphy T; 64 Bruno Reagan G; 52 Dare Rosenthal T; 63 Liam Ryan G/C; 72 Gunnar Vogel T; Defensive linemen: 17 Davin Bellamy DE; 6 Fadol Brown DE; 92 Malik Fisher DE; 95 Jarrell Owens DE; 96 Jacub Panasiuk DE; 97 Caraun Reid NT; 99 Joseph Wallace NT; 98 Gabe Wright NT	Linebackers: 43 Francis Bernard MLB; 20 Jamal Brooks MLB; 27 Ferrod Gardner OLB; 57 Anthony Hines OLB; 48 Andre Mintze OLB; 5 Reggie Northrup OLB; Defensive backs: 21 Joshua Allen SS; 29 Kentrell Brice FS; 22 Travon Fuller CB; 15 Michael Joseph CB; 24 Anthoula Kelly CB; 31 Cameron Lewis FS; 26 DeJuan Neal CB; 39 Santos Ramirez SS; 25 Reggie Robinson CB; 9 KJ Sails CB; 36 D. J. Swearinger SS; Special teams: 80 Trae Barry LS; 34 Matt McCrane K; 19 Daniel Whelan P	Reserve lists: 41 Jesse Aniebonam DE (IR); 67 Cody Conway T (IR); 33 Isaiah Johnson CB (IR); 51 Mike Maietti C (IR); 21 Montae Nicholson FS (IR); 28 Artavis Pierce RB (IR); 38 Nydair Rouse CB (IR); 90 Niles Scott NT (IR); 87 Kahale Warring TE (IR); 51 active, 9 inactive

== Background ==
The 2020 season was the inaugural season for the DC Defenders as a professional club. They were playing as charter members of the rebooted XFL, one of eight teams to compete in the league for the season. The Defenders played their home games at Audi Field and were led by head coach Pep Hamilton.

Their inaugural season was cut short due to the COVID-19 pandemic and the XFL officially suspended operations for the remainder of the season on March 20, 2020. The Defenders finished the season with a 3–2 record.

== Schedule ==
All times Eastern

Week	Day	Date	Kickoff	TV	Opponent	Results		Location	Attendance
Week	Day	Date	Kickoff	TV	Opponent	Score	Record	Location	Attendance
1	Sunday	February 19	8:00 p.m.	ESPN	Seattle Sea Dragons	22–18	1–0	Audi Field	12,438
2	Saturday	February 25	7:00 p.m.	FX	at Vegas Vipers	18–6	2–0	Cashman Field	6,023
3	Sunday	March 5	1:00 p.m.	FX	St. Louis BattleHawks	34–28	3–0	Audi Field	16,212
4	Sunday	March 12	7:00 p.m.	ESPN2	Vegas Vipers	32–18	4–0	Audi Field	11,521
5	Saturday	March 18	7:00 p.m.	FX	at St. Louis BattleHawks	28–20	5–0	The Dome at America's Center	35,868
6	Monday	March 27	7:00 p.m.	ESPN2	Houston Roughnecks	37–26	6–0	Audi Field	12,492
7	Saturday	April 1	6:00 p.m.	ESPN	at Orlando Guardians	36–37	6–1	Camping World Stadium	7,011
8	Sunday	April 9	7:00 p.m.	ESPN2	at Seattle Sea Dragons	34–33	7–1	Lumen Field	11,874
9	Sunday	April 16	12:00 p.m.	ESPN	Arlington Renegades	28–26 (OT)	8–1	Audi Field	18,684
10	Saturday	April 22	3:00 p.m.	ABC	at San Antonio Brahmas	29–28	9–1	Alamodome	12,129

=== Game summaries ===
==== Week 1: vs. Seattle Sea Dragons ====
Week 1: Seattle Sea Dragons at DC Defenders – Game summary

Quarter	1	2	3	4	Total
Sea Dragons	9	0	9	0	18
Defenders	0	8	8	6	22

at Audi Field, Washington, DC

- Date: February 19
- Game time: 8:00 p.m. EDT
- Game weather: 56 °F (13 °C)
- Game attendance: 12,438
- Referee: Jeff Heaser
- TV announcers (ESPN): John Schriffen, Tom Luginbill, and Stormy Buonantony

Game information

First quarter

- SEA – Josh Gordon 6-yard pass from Ben DiNucci (3-pt Conversion No Good), 9:13. Sea Dragons 6–0. Drive: 11 plays, 71 yards, 5:47.
- SEA – Dominik Eberle 36-yard field goal, 1:36. Sea Dragons 9–0. Drive: 11 plays, 52 yards, 5:52.

Second quarter

- DC – Jordan Ta'amu 1-yard rush (2-pt Conversion Good by Lucky Jackson), 8:58. Sea Dragons 9–8. Drive: 15 plays, 73 yards, 7:23.

Third quarter

- SEA – Brenden Knox 13-yard rush (3-pt Conversion Good by Ben DiNucci), 9:42. Sea Dragons 18–8. Drive: 8 plays, 56 yards, 3:45.
- DC – Michael Joseph 15-yard interception return (2-pt Conversion Good by D'Eriq King), 6:28. Sea Dragons 18–16. Drive: 1 play, 15 yards, 0:04.

Fourth quarter

- DC – D'Eriq King 5-yard rush (2-pt Conversion No Good), 14:14. Defenders 22–18. Drive: 2 plays, 4 yards, 0:34.

Top passers

- SEA – Ben DiNucci – 35/54, 282 yards, 1 TD, 2 INT
- DC – Jordan Ta'amu – 8/19, 86 yards, 0 TD, 1 INT

Top rushers

- SEA – Brenden Knox – 11 rushes, 31 yards
- DC – Abram Smith – 11 rushes, 28 yards

Top receivers

- SEA – Jahcour Pearson – 12 receptions, 95 yards
- DC – Lucky Jackson – 4 receptions, 25 yards

==== Week 2: at Vegas Vipers ====
Week 2: DC Defenders at Vegas Vipers – Game summary

Quarter	1	2	3	4	Total
Defenders	0	0	3	15	18
Vipers	6	0	0	0	6

at Cashman Field, Las Vegas, Nevada

- Date: February 25
- Game time: 7:00 p.m. EDT
- Game weather: 56 °F (13 °C)
- Game attendance: 6,023
- Referee: Jason Autrey
- TV announcers (FX): John Schriffen, Tom Luginbill, and Stormy Buonantony

Game information

First quarter

- VGS – DeAndre Torrey 2-yard rush (2-pt Conversion No Good), 12:10. Vipers 6–0. Drive: 1 play, 98 yards, 0:04.

Second quarter

- No scoring plays.

Third quarter

- DC – Matt McCrane 47-yard field goal, 9:41. Vipers 6–3. Drive: 11 plays, 42 yards, 5:19.

Fourth quarter

- DC – D'Eriq King 12-yard rush (1-pt Conversion Good by D'Eriq King), 14:58. Defenders 10–6. Drive: 10 plays, 80 yards, 4:21.
- DC – Abram Smith 9-yard rush (2-pt Conversion Good by Ethan Wolf), 8:43. Defenders 18–6. Drive: 5 plays, 44 yards, 2:16.

Top passers

- DC – Jordan Ta'amu – 11/23, 93 yards
- VGS – Brett Hundley – 11/18, 98 yards

Top rushers

- DC – Abram Smith – 15 rushes, 71 yards
- VGS – Rod Smith – 7 rushes, 39 yards

Top receivers

- DC – Josh Hammond – 3 receptions, 24 yards
- VGS – John Lovett – 2 receptions, 33 yards

==== Week 3: vs. St. Louis BattleHawks ====
Week 3: St. Louis BattleHawks at DC Defenders – Game summary

Quarter	1	2	3	4	Total
BattleHawks	8	6	6	8	28
Defenders	14	0	11	9	34

at Audi Field, Washington, DC

- Date: March 5
- Game time: 1:00 p.m. EDT
- Game weather: 62 °F (17 °C)
- Game attendance: 16,212
- Referee: Chris Coyte
- TV announcers (FX): John Schriffen, Tom Luginbill, and Stormy Buonantony

Game information

First quarter

- DC – Ethan Wolf 7-yard pass from Jordan Ta'amu (2-pt Conversion Good by Ethan Wolf), 10:31. Defenders 8–0. Drive: 7 Plays, 77 Yards, 2:26.
- DC – Michael Joseph 42-yard interception return (2-pt Conversion No Good), 9:45. Defenders 14–0. Drive: 2 Plays, 4 Yards, 0:46.
- STL – Brian Hill 8-yard pass from A. J. McCarron (2-pt Conversion Good by Darrius Shepherd), 5:33. Defenders 14–8. Drive: 8 Plays, 73 Yards, 4:12.

Second quarter

- STL – Hakeem Butler 1-yard pass from A. J. McCarron (2-pt Conversion No Good), 0:03. Tied 14–14. Drive: 9 Plays, 75 Yards, 2:20.

Third quarter

- DC – Matt McCrane 41-yard field goal, 9:24. Defenders 17–14. Drive: 11 Plays, 48 Yards, 5:18.
- STL – Jake Sutherland 23-yard pass from A. J. McCarron (2-pt Conversion No Good), 8:26. BattleHawks 20–17. Drive: 2 Plays, 25 Yards, 1:16.
- DC – Jordan Ta'amu 2-yard rush (2-pt Conversion Good by Lucky Jackson), 3:08. Defenders 25–20. Drive: 12 Plays, 81 Yards, 5:18.

Fourth quarter

- DC – Matt McCrane 35-yard field goal, 15:00. Defenders 28–20. Drive: 4 Plays, 7 Yards, 1:40.
- DC – Chris Blair 4-yard pass from D'Eriq King (2-pt Conversion No Good), 6:02. Defenders 34–20. Drive: 12 Plays, 67 Yards, 6:46.
- STL – Steven Mitchell 2-yard pass from A. J. McCarron (2-pt Conversion Good by Steven Mitchell), 0:22. Defenders 34–28. Drive: 1 Play, 2 Yards, 0:00.

Top passers

- STL – A. J. McCarron – 26/42, 262 yards, 4 TD, 2 INT
- DC – Jordan Ta'amu – 11/20, 196 yards, TD

Top rushers

- STL – Brian Hill – 12 rushes, 32 yards
- DC – Abram Smith – 16 rushes, 54 yards

Top receivers

- STL – Hakeem Butler – 9 receptions, 105 yards
- DC – Lucky Jackson – 4 receptions, 89 yards

==== Week 4: vs. Vegas Vipers ====
Week 4: Vegas Vipers at DC Defenders – Game summary

Quarter	1	2	3	4	Total
Vipers	3	3	0	12	18
Defenders	6	8	6	12	32

at Audi Field, Washington, DC

- Date: March 12
- Game time: 7:00 p.m. EDT
- Game weather: 40 °F (4 °C)
- Game attendance: 11,521
- Referee: Jeff Heaser
- TV announcers (ESPN2): Matt Barrie, Joey Galloway, and Tiffany Blackmon

Game information

First quarter

- DC – D'Eriq King 5-yard rush (2-pt Conversion No Good), 13:11. Defenders 6–0. Drive: 4 Plays, 21 Yards, 1:35.
- VGS – Bailey Giffen 37-yard field goal, 0:50. Defenders 6–3. Drive: 6 Plays, 44 Yards, 2:49.

Second quarter

- DC – D'Eriq King 2-yard rush (2-pt Conversion Good by Chris Blair), 10:42. Defenders 14–3. Drive: 11 Plays, 72 Yards, 5:08.
- VGS – Bailey Giffen 33-yard field goal, 5:15. Defenders 14–6. Drive: 11 Plays, 50 Yards, 5:27.

Third quarter

- DC – Matt McCrane 20-yard field goal, 6:48. Defenders 17–6. Drive: 12 Plays, 80 Yards, 6:10.
- DC – Matt McCrane 35-yard field goal, 1:44. Defenders 20–6. Drive: 5 Plays, 43 Yards, 2:36.

Fourth quarter

- VGS – Cinque Sweeting 26-yard pass from Luis Perez (2-pt Conversion No Good), 14:22. Defenders 20–12. Drive: 5 Plays, 74 Yards, 2:22.
- DC – Matt McCrane 26-yard field goal, 6:53. Defenders 23–12. Drive: 14 Plays, 76 Yards, 7:29.
- DC – Jequez Ezzard 32-yard pass from D'Eriq King (2-pt Conversion No Good), 2:40. Defenders 29–12. Drive: 6 Plays, 52 Yards, 2:49.
- VGS – Cinque Sweeting 25-yard pass from Luis Perez (3-pt Conversion No Good), 1:55. Defenders 29–18. Drive: 2 Plays, 30 Yards, 0:45.
- DC – Matt McCrane 23-yard field goal, 0:47. Defenders 32–18. Drive: 5 Plays, 16 Yards, 1:02.

Top passers

- VGS – Luis Perez – 23/32, 283 yards, 2 TD
- DC – Jordan Ta'amu – 14/19, 177 yards, 0 TD

Top rushers

- VGS – John Lovett – 7 rushes, 39 yards
- DC – Abram Smith – 22 rushes, 58 yards

Top receivers

- VGS – Jeff Badet – 7 receptions, 80 yards
- DC – Josh Hammond – 5 receptions, 17 yards

==== Week 5: at St. Louis BattleHawks ====
Week 5: DC Defenders at St. Louis BattleHawks – Game summary

Quarter	1	2	3	4	Total
Defenders	0	14	6	8	28
BattleHawks	0	3	9	8	20

at The Dome at America's Center, St. Louis, Missouri

- Date: March 18
- Game time: 7:00 p.m. EDT
- Game weather: 27 °F (−3 °C)
- Game attendance: 35,868
- Referee: Francisco Villar
- TV announcers (FX): John Schriffen, Tom Luginbill, and Stormy Buonantony

Game information

First quarter

Second quarter

- STL – Donny Hageman 36-yard field goal, 10:02. BattleHawks 3–0. Drive: 16 Plays, 72 Yards, 8:55.
- DC – Abram Smith 62-yard rush (2-pt Conversion good by Josh Hammond), 9:22. Defenders 8–3. Drive: 2 Plays, 68 Yards, 0:38.
- DC – Abram Smith 5-yard rush (2-pt Conversion No Good), 1:54. Defenders 14–3. Drive: 3 Plays, 14 Yards, 0:12.

Third quarter

- STL – Donny Hageman 34-yard field goal, 13:16. Defenders 14–6. Drive: 4 Plays, 0 Yards, 1:44.
- DC – Abram Smith 70-yard rush (2-pt Conversion No Good), 12:24. Defenders 20–6. Drive: 2 Plays, 73 Yards, 0:51.
- STL – George Campbell 5-yard pass from A. J. McCarron (2-pt Conversion No Good), 6:20. Defenders 20–12. Drive: 11 Plays, 65 Yards, 5:56.

Fourth quarter

- DC – D'Eriq King 10-yard rush (2-pt Conversion Good by Jordan Ta'amu), 12:16. Defenders 28–12. Drive: 7 Plays, 65 Yards, 3:31.
- STL – Steven Mitchell 50-yard pass from A. J. McCarron (2-pt Conversion Good by Steven Mitchell), 4:19. Defenders 28–20. Drive: 4 Plays, 71 Yards, 1:43.

Top passers

- DC – Jordan Ta'amu – 12/18, 90 yards, 0 TD
- STL – A. J. McCarron – 22/34, 236 yards, 2 TD

Top rushers

- DC – Abram Smith – 23 rushes, 218 yards
- STL – Brian Hill – 14 rushes, 79 yards

Top receivers

- DC – Lucky Jackson – 5 receptions, 54 yards
- STL – Hakeem Butler – 9 receptions, 86 yards

==== Week 6: vs. Houston Roughnecks ====
Week 6: Houston Roughnecks at DC Defenders – Game summary

Quarter	1	2	3	4	Total
Roughnecks	8	0	6	12	26
Defenders	3	14	9	11	37

at Audi Field, Washington, DC

- Date: March 27
- Game time: 7:00 p.m. EDT
- Game weather: 60 °F (16 °C)
- Game attendance: 12,492
- Referee: Reggie Smith
- TV announcers (ESPN2): Taylor Zarzour, Tom Luginbill, and Stormy Buonantony

Game information

First quarter

- HOU – Max Borghi 4-yard rush (2-pt Conversion Good by Cedric Byrd), 5:08. Roughnecks 8–0. Drive: 8 Plays, 66 Yards, 4:32.
- DC – Matt McCrane 34-yard field goal, 1:18. Roughnecks 8–3. Drive: 8 Plays, 52 Yards, 3:50.

Second quarter

- DC – Abram Smith 1-yard rush (2-pt Conversion No Good), 1:57. Defenders 9–8. Drive: 10 Plays, 61 Yards, 4:37.
- DC – Interception returned for touchdown by Santos Ramirez (2-pt Conversion Good by Josh Hammond), 1:15. Defenders 17–8. Drive: 1 Play, -12 Yards, 0:42.

Third quarter

- DC – Alex Ellis 1-yard pass from Jordan Ta'amu (2-pt Conversion No Good), 10:12. Defenders 23–8. Drive: 8 Plays, 72 Yards, 4:48.
- DC – Matt McCrane 32-yard field goal, 2:08. Defenders 26–8. Drive: 11 Plays, 44 Yards, 6:03.
- HOU – Deontay Burnett 85-yard pass from Cole McDonald (3-pt Conversion No Good), 1:19. Defenders 26–14. Drive: 2 Plays, 86 Yards, 0:49.

Fourth quarter

- DC – Lucky Jackson 30-yard pass from Jordan Ta'amu (2-pt Conversion Good by Chris Blair), 13:16. Defenders 34–14. Drive: 6 Plays, 76 Yards, 3:04.
- HOU – Max Borghi 1-yard rush (2-pt Conversion No Good), 10:03. Defenders 34–20. Drive: 6 Plays, 65 Yards, 3:12.
- DC – Matt McCrane 50-yard field goal, 6:14. Defenders 37–20. Drive: 7 Plays, 36 Yards, 3:49.
- HOU – Cole McDonald 1-yard rush (3-pt Conversion No Good), 1:57. Defenders 37–26. Drive: 9 Plays, 62 Yards, 4:17.

Top passers

- HOU – Brandon Silvers – 10/17, 111 yards, 0 TD
- DC – Jordan Ta'amu – 19/31, 245 yards, 2 TD

Top rushers

- HOU – Max Borghi – 11 rushes, 25 yards
- DC – Abram Smith – 19 rushes, 95 yards

Top receivers

- HOU – Travell Harris – 5 receptions, 60 yards
- DC – Lucky Jackson – 5 receptions, 136 yards

==== Week 7: at Orlando Guardians ====
Week 7: DC Defenders at Orlando Guardians – Game summary

Quarter	1	2	3	4	Total
Defenders	14	8	6	8	36
Guardians	12	6	13	6	37

at Camping World Stadium, Orlando, Florida

- Date: April 1
- Game time: 6:00 p.m. EDT
- Game weather: 85 °F (29 °C)
- Game attendance: 7,011
- Referee: Chris Coyte
- TV announcers (FX): John Schriffen, Tom Luginbill, and Harry Douglas

Game information

First quarter

- DC – Lucky Jackson 32-yard pass from Jordan Ta'amu (2-pt Conversion Good by Chris Blair), 13:08. Defenders 8–0. Drive: 5 Plays, 74 Yards, 1:52.
- ORL – Quinten Dormady 1-yard rush (1-pt Conversion No Good), 10:47. Defenders 8–6. Drive: 6 Plays, 45 Yards, 2:21.
- ORL – K. D. Cannon 41-yard pass from Quinten Dormady (1-pt Conversion No Good), 8:01. Guardians 12–8. Drive: 3 Plays, 58 Yards, 1:09.
- DC – Abram Smith 1-yard rush (2-pt Conversion No Good), 3:14. Defenders 14–12. Drive: 11 Plays, 69 Yards, 4:40.

Second quarter

- DC – Briley Moore 12-yard pass from D'Eriq King (2-pt Conversion Good by Alex Ellis), 13:00. Defenders 22–12. Drive: 9 Plays, 48 Yards, 3:20.
- ORL – Quinten Dormady 1-yard rush (2-pt Conversion No Good), 0:00. Defenders 22–18. Drive: 9 Plays, 55 Yards, 4:19.

Third quarter

- ORL – Jordan Thomas 15-yard pass from Quinten Dormady (1-pt Conversion Good by Jah-Maine Martin), 9:38. Guardians 25–22. Drive: 9 Plays, 46 Yards, 5:22.
- DC – Chris Blair 86-yard pass from Jordan Ta'amu (2-pt Conversion No Good), 8:29. Defenders 28–25. Drive: 3 Plays, 85 Yards, 1:09.
- ORL – Quinten Dormady 1-yard rush (1-pt Conversion No Good), 3:31. Guardians 31–28. Drive: 10 Plays, 60 Yards, 4:58.

Fourth quarter

- DC – Lucky Jackson 15-yard pass from Jordan Ta'amu (2-pt Conversion Good by Alex Ellis), 11:37. Defenders 36–31. Drive: 5 Plays, 50 Yards, 1:39.
- ORL – Cody Latimer 44-yard pass from Quinten Dormady (2-pt Conversion No Good), 8:50. Guardians 37–36. Drive: 6 Plays, 65 Yards, 2:47.

Top passers

- DC – Jordan Ta'amu – 21/29, 285 yards, 3 TD
- ORL – Quinten Dormady – 27/34, 328 yards, 3 TD

Top rushers

- DC – Abram Smith – 18 rushes, 127 yards
- ORL – Devin Darrington – 13 rushes, 17 yards

Top receivers

- DC – Chris Blair – 5 receptions, 139 yards
- ORL – Cody Latimer – 7 receptions, 93 yards

==== Week 8: at Seattle Sea Dragons ====
Week 8: DC Defenders at Seattle Sea Dragons – Game summary

Quarter	1	2	3	4	Total
Defenders	8	8	6	12	34
Sea Dragons	0	6	9	18	33

at Lumen Field, Seattle, Washington

- Date: April 9
- Game time: 7:00 p.m. EDT
- Game weather: 58 °F (14 °C)
- Game attendance: 11,874
- Referee: Jason Autrey
- TV announcers (ESPN2): Roy Philpott, Eric Mac Lain, Tiffany Blackmon

Game information

First quarter

- DC – Abram Smith 2-yard rush (2-pt Conversion Good by Lucky Jackson), 9:22. Defenders 8–0. Drive: 3 Plays, 64 Yards, 0:55.

Second quarter

- SEA – Phillip Lindsay 2-yard rush (3-pt Conversion No Good), 10:35. Defenders 8–6. Drive: 12 Plays, 60 Yards, 6:47.
- DC – Ryquell Armstead 11-yard pass from Jordan Ta'amu (2-pt Conversion Good by Lucky Jackson), 1:24. Defenders 16–6. Drive: 9 Plays, 60 Yards, 3:59.

Third quarter

- DC – Alex Ellis 14-yard pass from Jordan Ta'amu (2-pt Conversion No Good), 8:34. Defenders 22–6. Drive: 7 Plays, 71 Yards, 4:22.
- SEA – Defensive 2-pt Conversion, 8:34. Defenders 22–8. Drive: 1 play, -5 yards, 0:01.
- SEA – Juwan Green 46-yard pass from Ben DiNucci (1-pt Conversion Good by Blake Jackson), 6:33. Defenders 22–15. Drive: 4 Plays, 75 Yards, 2:02.

Fourth quarter

- SEA – Dominik Eberle 29-yard field goal, 12:37. Defenders 22–18. Drive: 7 Plays, 44 Yards, 3:15.
- DC – Brandon Smith 5-yard pass from Jordan Ta'amu (2-pt Conversion No Good), 5:13. Defenders 28–18. Drive: 13 Plays, 73 Yards, 7:24.
- SEA – Juwan Green 56-yard pass from Ben DiNucci (3-pt Conversion Good by Blake Jackson), 4:05. Defenders 28–27. Drive: 3 Plays, 79 Yards, 1:09.
- DC – Chris Blair 70-yard pass from Jordan Ta'amu (2-pt Conversion No Good), 2:10. Defenders 34–27. Drive: 3 Plays, 72 Yards, 2:02.
- SEA – Jahcour Pearson 14-yard pass from Ben DiNucci (2-pt Conversion No Good), 0:32. Defenders 34–33. Drive: 9 Plays, 70 Yards, 1:31.

Top passers

- DC – Jordan Ta'amu – 17/26, 247 yards, 4 TD
- SEA – Ben DiNucci – 28/42, 301 yards, 3 TD

Top rushers

- DC – Abram Smith – 17 rushes, 66 yards
- SEA – Phillip Lindsay – 8 rushes, 23 yards

Top receivers

- DC – Chris Blair – 5 receptions, 148 yards
- SEA – Juwan Green – 7 receptions, 142 yards

==== Week 9: vs. Arlington Renegades ====
Week 9: Arlington Renegades at DC Defenders – Game summary

Quarter	1	2	3	4	OT	Total
Renegades	3	6	0	17	0	26
Defenders	6	14	6	0	2	28

at Audi Field, Washington, DC

- Date: April 16
- Game time: 12:00 p.m. EDT
- Game weather: 77 °F (25 °C)
- Game attendance: 18,684
- Referee: Francisco Villar
- TV announcers (ESPN): John Schriffen, Tom Luginbill, and Stormy Buonantony

Game information

First quarter

- ARL – Taylor Russolino 23-yard field goal, 9:39. Renegades 3–0 Drive: 9 Plays, 79 Yards, 5:21.
- DC – Josh Hammond 9-yard pass from Jordan Ta'amu (2-pt Conversion No Good), 7:54. Defenders 6–3. Drive: 5 Plays, 71 Yards, 1:45.

Second quarter

- DC – Lucky Jackson 14-yard pass from Jordan Ta'amu (2-pt Conversion No Good), 9:27. Defenders 12–3. Drive: 5 Plays, 70 Yards, 3:08.
- ARL – Caleb Vander Esch 25-yard pass from Luis Perez (2-pt Conversion No Good), 6:26. Defenders 12–9. Drive: 7 Plays, 65 Yards, 3:01.
- DC – Lucky Jackson 6-yard pass from D'Eriq King (2-pt Conversion Good by Jazz Ferguson), 0:46. Defenders 20–9. Drive: 11 Plays, 77 Yards, 5:40.

Third quarter

- DC – Pass interception returned for touchdown by D. J. Swearinger (2-pt Conversion No Good), 9:40. Defenders 26–9. Drive: 6 Plays, 43 Yards, 3:50.

Fourth quarter

- ARL – De'Veon Smith 1-yard rush (2-pt Conversion No Good), 12:49. Defenders 26–15. Drive: 6 Plays, 31 Yards, 3:00.
- ARL – De'Veon Smith 1-yard rush (2-pt Conversion Good by Tyler Vaughns), 1:20. Defenders 26–23. Drive: 9 Plays, 67 Yards, 4:02.
- ARL – Taylor Russolino 27-yard field goal, 0:05. Tied 26–26. Drive: 8 Plays, 66 Yards, 1:15.

Overtime

- DC – Josh Hammond pass from Jordan Ta'amu for 2 points

Top passers

- ARL – Luis Perez – 31/41, 335 yards, 1 TD
- DC – Jordan Ta'amu – 14/20, 188 yards, 2 TD

Top rushers

- ARL – De'Veon Smith – 12 rushes, 43 yards
- DC – Abram Smith – 10 rushes, 27 yards

Top receivers

- ARL – Sal Cannella – 7 receptions, 92 yards
- DC – Josh Hammond – 5 receptions, 74 yards

==== Week 10: at San Antonio Brahmas ====
Week 10: DC Defenders at San Antonio Brahmas – Game summary

Quarter	1	2	3	4	Total
Defenders	11	8	3	7	29
Brahmas	3	8	9	8	28

at Alamodome, San Antonio, Texas

- Date: April 22
- Game time: 3:00 p.m. EDT
- Game weather: 78 °F (26 °C)
- Game attendance: 12,129
- Referee: Reggie Smith
- TV announcers (ABC): Tom Hart, Greg McElroy, Cole Cubelic and Katie George

Game information

First quarter

- DC – Alex Ellis 5-yard pass from Jordan Ta'amu (2-pt Conversion Good by Josh Hammond), 12:41. Defenders 8–0. Drive: 5 Plays, 68 Yards, 2:19.
- SA – Parker Romo 26-yard field goal, 4:06. Defenders 8–3. Drive: 16 Plays, 64 Yards, 8:35.
- DC – Matt McCrane 21-yard field goal, 2:31. Defenders 11–3. Drive: 4 Plays, 5 Yards, 1:35.

Second quarter

- DC – Alex Ellis 1-yard pass from Jordan Ta'amu (2-pt Conversion Good by Brandon Smith), 11:44. Defenders 19–3. Drive: 5 Plays, 86 Yards, 2:03.
- SA – Jacques Patrick 1-yard rush (2-pt Conversion Good by T. J. Vasher), 0:03. Defenders 19–11. Drive: 6 Plays, 44 Yards, 0:30.

Third quarter

- SA – Parker Romo 28-yard field goal, 8:14. Defenders 19–14. Drive: 11 Plays, 60 Yards, 6:46.
- DC – Matt McCrane 49-yard field goal, 4:43. Defenders 22–14. Drive: 7 Plays, 45 Yards, 3:31.
- SA – Jon Hilliman 1-yard rush (2-pt Conversion No Good), 0:06. Defenders 22–20. Drive: 9 Plays, 75 Yards, 4:37.

Fourth quarter

- SA – Jacques Patrick 2-yard rush (2-pt Conversion Good by Jon Hilliman), 5:16. Brahmas 28–22. Drive: 10 Plays, 63 Yards, 6:27.
- DC – Jordan Ta'amu 4-yard rush (1-pt Conversion Good by Jordan Ta'amu), 2:32. Defenders 29–28. Drive: 5 Plays, 69 Yards, 2:43.

Top passers

- DC – Jordan Ta'amu – 15/22, 271 yards, 2 TD
- SA – Jack Coan – 34/48, 312 yards, 0 TD

Top rushers

- DC – Abram Smith – 10 rushes, 44 yards
- SA – Jacques Patrick – 16 rushes, 41 yards

Top receivers

- DC – Josh Hammond – 4 receptions, 59 yards
- SA – Landen Akers – 8 receptions, 90 yards

== Standings ==
2023 XFL standings
North Division
Team	W	L	PCT	GB	TD+/-	TD+	TD-	DIV	PF	PA	DIFF	STK
(y) DC Defenders	9	1	.900	–	-2	33	35	6–0	298	240	58	W3
(x) Seattle Sea Dragons	7	3	.700	2	+10	30	20	3–3	243	177	66	W2
(e) St. Louis Battlehawks	7	3	.700	2	+9	32	23	3–3	249	202	47	W1
(e) Vegas Vipers	2	8	.200	7	0	28	28	0–6	184	252	-68	L3
South Division
Team	W	L	PCT	GB	TD+/-	TD+	TD-	DIV	PF	PA	DIFF	STK
(y) Houston Roughnecks	7	3	.700	–	+4	30	26	6–0	247	182	65	W3
(x) Arlington Renegades	4	6	.400	3	-8	15	23	3–3	146	194	-48	L2
(e) San Antonio Brahmas	3	7	.300	4	-8	16	24	3–3	169	183	-14	L1
(e) Orlando Guardians	1	9	.100	6	-5	32	37	0–6	204	310	-106	L3
(x)–clinched playoff berth; (y)–clinched division; (e)–eliminated from playoff contention

== Postseason ==
=== Schedule ===
Week	Day	Date	Kickoff	TV	Opponent	Results		Location	Attendance
Week	Day	Date	Kickoff	TV	Opponent	Score	Record	Location	Attendance
Division Finals	Sunday	April 30	3:00 p.m.	ESPN	Seattle Sea Dragons	37–21	1–0	Audi Field	18,684
XFL Championship	Saturday	May 13	8:00 p.m.	ABC	vs. Arlington Renegades	26–35	1–1	Alamodome	22,754

=== Game summaries ===
==== XFL North Division Finals: vs. (2) Seattle Sea Dragons ====
XFL North Division Finals: (2) Seattle Sea Dragons at (1) DC Defenders – Game summary

Quarter	1	2	3	4	Total
Sea Dragons	3	6	0	12	21
Defenders	9	0	14	14	37

at Audi Field, Washington, DC

- Date: May 3
- Game time: 3:00 p.m. EDT
- Game weather: 61 °F (16 °C)
- Game attendance: 18,684
- Referee: Reggie Smith
- TV announcers (ESPN): Tom Hart, Greg McElroy, Cole Cubelic and Katie George

Game information

First quarter

- SEA – Dominik Eberle 33-yard field goal, 9:54. Sea Dragons 3–0. Drive: 10 Plays, 59 Yards, 5:06.
- DC – Matt McCrane 24-yard field goal, 6:55. Tied 3–3. Drive: 6 Plays, 59 Yards, 2:59.
- DC – Lucky Jackson 44-yard pass from Jordan Ta'amu (2-pt Conversion No Good), 1:59. Defenders 9–3. Drive: 7 Plays, 69 Yards, 3:05.

Second quarter

- SEA – Jahcour Pearson 15-yard pass from Ben DiNucci (2-pt Conversion No Good), 11:3. Tied 9–9. Drive: 10 Plays, 76 Yards, 5:21.

Third quarter

- DC – Abram Smith 1-yard rush (2-pt Conversion No Good), 9:25. Defenders 15–9. Drive: 11 Plays, 78 Yards, 5:35.
- DC – Ethan Wolf 26-yard pass from Jordan Ta'amu (2-pt Conversion Good by Alex Ellis), 4:49. Defenders 23–9. Drive: 6 Plays, 56 Yards, 2:36.

Fourth quarter

- DC – Cam'Ron Harris 1-yard rush (1-pt Conversion Good by Abram Smith), 11:53. Defenders 30–9. Drive: 9 Plays, 65 Yards, 4:41.
- SEA – Juwan Green 34-yard pass from Ben DiNucci (2-pt Conversion No Good), 6:05. Defenders 30–15. Drive: 4 Plays, 65 Yards, 1:38.
- DC – Cam'Ron Harris 11-yard rush (1-pt Conversion Good by Cam'Ron Harris), 2:06. Defenders 37–15. Drive: 9 Plays, 67 Yards, 3:59.
- SEA – Juwan Green 8-yard pass from Ben DiNucci (3-pt Conversion No Good), 0:12. Defenders 37–21. Drive: 10 Plays, 64 Yards, 1:54.

Top passers

- SEA – Ben DiNucci – 31/48, 295 yards, 3 TD
- DC – Jordan Ta'amu – 19/31, 258 yards, 2 TD

Top rushers

- SEA – Ben DiNucci – 3 rushes, 16 yards
- DC – Abram Smith – 23 rushes, 48 yards

Top receivers

- SEA – Juwan Green – 8 receptions, 89 yards
- DC – Josh Hammond – 6 receptions, 55 yards

==== XFL Championship Game: vs. Arlington Renegades ====
XFL Championship Game: (2) Arlington Renegades at (1) DC Defenders – Game summary

Quarter	1	2	3	4	Total
Renegades	14	6	12	3	35
Defenders	0	6	14	6	26

at Alamodome, San Antonio, Texas

- Date: May 16
- Game time: 8:00 p.m. EDT
- Game weather: 76 °F (24 °C)
- Game attendance: 22,754
- Referee: Michael VanderVelde
- TV announcers (ABC): Tom Hart, Greg McElroy, Cole Cubelic and Katie George

Game information

First quarter

- ARL – Sal Cannella 41-yard pass from Luis Perez (2-pt Conversion No Good), 11:00. Renegades 6–0. Drive: 2 Plays, 59 Yards, 4:02.
- ARL – Tyler Vaughns 9-yard pass from Luis Perez (2-pt Conversion Good De'Veon Smith), 0:29. Renegades 14–0. Drive: 16 Plays, 88 Yards, 8:45.

Second quarter

- ARL – Taylor Russolino 29-yard field goal, 4:54. Renegades 17–0. Drive: 13 Plays, 54 Yards, 6:50.
- DC – Abram Smith 2-yard rush (2-pt Conversion No Good), 0:32. Renegades 17–6. Drive: 10 Plays, 45 Yards, 4:22.
- ARL – Taylor Russolino 51-yard field goal, 0:02. Renegades 20–6. Drive: 3 Plays, 12 Yards, 0:30.

Third quarter

- DC – Abram Smith 52-yard rush (2-pt Conversion No Good), 11:42. Renegades 20–12. Drive: 7 Plays, 71 Yards, 3:27.
- ARL – Leddie Brown 7-yard rush (1-pt Conversion No Good), 4:44. Renegades 26–12. Drive: 12 Plays, 71 Yards, 6:49.
- DC – Josh Hammond 72-yard pass from Jordan Ta'amu (2-pt Conversion Good by Abram Smith), 0:06. Renegades 26–20. Drive: 2 Plays, 70 Yards, 0:42.
- ARL – Leddie Brown 30-yard pass from Luis Perez (1-pt Conversion No Good), 0:00. Renegades 32–20. Drive: 1 Play, 30 Yards, 0:06.

Fourth quarter

- ARL – Taylor Russolino 33-yard field goal, 9:56. Renegades 35–20. Drive: 7 Plays, 8 Yards, 3:40.
- DC – Josh Hammond 24-yard pass from Jordan Ta'amu (2-pt Conversion No Good), 1:17. Renegades 35–26. Drive: 7 Plays, 78 Yards, 0:45.

Top passers

- ARL – Luis Perez – 26/36, 288 yards, 3 TD
- DC – Jordan Ta'amu – 16/30, 245 yards, 2 TD

Top rushers

- ARL – De'Veon Smith – 15 rushes, 54 yards
- DC – Abram Smith – 13 rushes, 90 yards

Top receivers

- ARL – Tyler Vaughns – 8 receptions, 83 yards
- DC – Josh Hammond – 6 receptions, 127 yards

== Staff ==
DC Defenders staff
Front office: Director of team operations – Stacie Johnson; Director of player personnel – Von Hutchins; Head coach: Head coach/general manager – Reggie Barlow; Offensive coaches: Offensive coordinator/running backs – Fred Kaiss; Wide Receivers - Alvance Robinson; Tight Ends - Cody Crills; Offensive Line - Russ Ehrenfeld	Defensive coaches: Defensive coordinator/secondary – Gregg Williams; Defensive Line - Jeremy Watkins; Linebackers/Special Teams - Jamie Sharper; Team operations: Quality Control – Deion Harris; Athletic Trainer – Chris Lacsamana; Equipment Manager – VanDyke Jones; Video Manager – Caleb Studivant
