= 2025 UFL championship game =

American football championship game

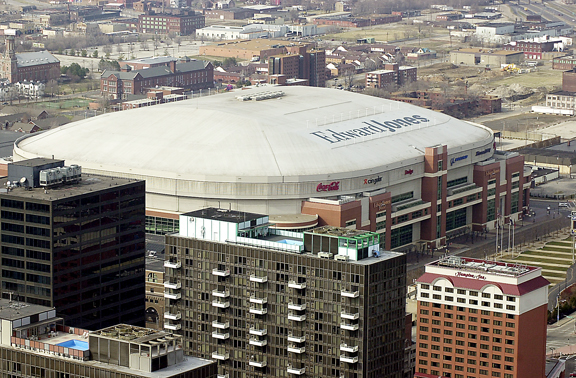
- The Dome at America's Center (pictured as Edward Jones Dome), where the game was played.
Michigan Panthers (6–4)	DC Defenders (6–4)
34	58
Head coach: Mike Nolan	Head coach: Shannon Harris
	1	2	3	4	Total
MICH	13	6	0	15	34
DC	6	31	9	12	58
- Date: June 14, 2025
- Kickoff time: 8:00 p.m. EDT (UTC-4)
- Stadium: The Dome at America's Center; St. Louis, Missouri
- MVP: Jordan Ta'amu, quarterback
- Referee: Bryan Banks
- Attendance: 14,559

Ceremonies
- National anthem: Josh Kennedy
- Halftime show: The Black Moods

TV in the United States
- Network: ABC
- Announcers: Joe Tessitore (play-by-play), Jordan Rodgers (analyst), Sam Acho (sideline reporter), Tom Luginbill (sideline reporter) and Erin Dolan (betting)
- Nielsen ratings: 1.0 (0.98 million viewers)

The 2025 UFL Championship Game was an American football game played on June 14, 2025, at The Dome at America's Center in St. Louis, Missouri. The contest determined the champion of the 2025 UFL season and was played between the USFL Conference title winners, the Michigan Panthers, and the XFL Conference title winners, the DC Defenders. The Defenders won by a score of 34-58, and this has been the highest-scoring United Bowl ever, with a combined 92 points. The game began at 8:00 p.m. EDT and aired on ABC.

== Background ==
=== Host selection ===
The UFL awards its championship games to an ostensibly neutral site chosen among the league's existing home cities. Its lead time is substantially shorter than the several years advance notice given for the Super Bowl, the National Football League title game; the UFL has typically awarded the championship roughly two months in advance, early in that year's regular season.

In contrast to the 2024 competition, where St. Louis was the runaway favorite over only one other bid known to have been seriously considered (that of Canton, Ohio's Tom Benson Hall of Fame Stadium), the 2025 championship faced multiple scheduling conflicts, most prominently with the 2025 FIFA Club World Cup and the 2025 CONCACAF Gold Cup, both slated to begin the same weekend. The DC Defenders' Audi Field, which had been an early favorite to host the game, and Lumen Field in Seattle, Washington, with which the UFL maintains a retainer agreement dating to the Seattle Sea Dragons, were both ruled out due to those stadiums hosting major soccer tournaments; the Alamodome, host of the 2023 XFL title game, has a concert the previous day, while Simmons Bank Liberty Stadium in Memphis will be undergoing renovations (and itself has had some of the league's worst attendance). By October 2024, Protective Stadium in Birmingham had emerged as the favorite venue for the event; Birmingham had been the hub for the 2022 USFL season but was unable to host the playoffs that year, which were relocated to Canton. By February 2025, the league had soured on Birmingham due to the threat of oppressive summer heat, and—with some reluctance, given the high rate of no-shows for the 2024 title game following the St. Louis Battlehawks failing to advance to it—shifted efforts back to the Dome at America's Center, one of three domed stadiums (along with the Alamodome and Ford Field, the latter of which was presumed to be too expensive and was later revealed to not be available for the playoffs) in the UFL.

St. Louis was officially announced as the host of the 2025 championship on April 13, 2025, during halftime of the Battlehawks' game against the DC Defenders. The announcement also revealed the game would have a presenting sponsor, Underdog Fantasy Sports, which has been the league's fantasy sports partner since 2024.

=== UFL playoffs ===
The four teams competing in the playoff clinched their spot during week 8 of the 2025 regular season: Michigan, DC, St. Louis and Birmingham. Because of scheduling conflicts in Michigan and DC, they were unable to host playoff games, leading to St. Louis and Birmingham being awarded hosting of their playoff games by default.

In the USFL Conference Championship, the Panthers upset the three-time defending USFL champion Stallions 44–29. It was the first win against the Stallions in the current Panthers' history, as all seven previous attempts (six regular season games and the 2024 USFL conference championship) had been in Birmingham's favor. In the history of the brands, Michigan had not defeated Birmingham since week 1 of the inaugural 1983 USFL season, a year in which that version of the Panthers made (and won in) their only league championship appearance.

In the XFL Conference Championship, the Defenders upset the host St. Louis Battlehawks 36–18. It was the second consecutive year in which St. Louis was awarded the league championship hosting and finished with the best record in the XFL conference only to lose in the conference championship and fail to advance to the title game.

==== Bracket ====
Conference finals June 8, 2025
USFL1	Birmingham Stallions	29
USFL2	Michigan Panthers	44
XFL1	St. Louis Battlehawks	18
XFL2	DC Defenders	36

UFL championship June 14, 2025
USFL2	Michigan Panthers	34
XFL2	DC Defenders	58

== Teams ==
=== Michigan Panthers ===
The 2025 Michigan Panthers season is the fourth season for the Michigan Panthers as a professional American football franchise and the second season in the United Football League (UFL). The Panthers play their home games at Ford Field and are led by third year head coach Mike Nolan.

The Panthers stormed to a 6–2 start, but lost the last two games to finish 6–4. However, even if they won those games, they would not host the USFL Conference Championship Game due to a scheduling conflict. They then went to Birmingham to play the Stallions in the USFL Conference Championship Game for the second consecutive year. Despite being 0–7 against the Stallions since 2022, the Panthers won 44–29, and became the first professional football team from Michigan to play in a championship game since the original USFL's Panthers won it in 1983.

This would be the last game in the Panthers' existence, after incoming co-owner Mike Repole shuttered the team in October 2025 due to the lack of a soccer-specific stadium in the Detroit metropolitan area and an unwillingness to continue using Ford Field or the Panthers' previous practice hub Rynearson Stadium.

=== DC Defenders ===
This was originally to be the final game with Shannon Harris as the Defenders' head coach, as he has already committed to join his predecessor Reggie Barlow at Tennessee State University at the end of the UFL season along with the rest of the Defenders' coaching staff. Harris struck an agreement to return as the Defenders' coach following the championship.

The 2025 DC Defenders season is the fourth season for the DC Defenders as a professional American football franchise and the second season in the United Football League (UFL). The Defenders play their home games at Audi Field and led by interim head coach Shannon Harris.

The Defenders had a 6–2 start, but lost the last two games to finish 6–4. However, even if they won those games, they wouldn't have hosted the XFL Conference Championship Game due to the same scheduling conflict the Panthers had. The Defenders defeated the Battlehawks, 36–18, to advance to their first UFL Championship Game.

== Game summary ==
=== Scoring summary ===
2025 UFL championship game

Quarter	1	2	3	4	Total
Michigan Panthers	13	6	0	15	34
DC Defenders	6	31	9	12	58

at The Dome at America's Center • St. Louis, Missouri

- Date: Saturday, June 14, 2025
- Game time: 8:00 p.m. EDT
- Game weather: Indoor stadium
- Game attendance: 14,559
- Referee: Bryan Banks
- TV announcers (ABC): Joe Tessitore (play-by-play), Jordan Rodgers (analyst), Sam Acho (sideline reporter), Tom Luginbill (sideline reporter) and Erin Dolan (betting)

Game information

First quarter

- MICH – Nate McCrary 35-yard rush (one-point rush fails), 11:52. Panthers 6–0. Drive: 6 plays, 67 yards, 3:16.
- DC – Jaydon Mickens 26-yard pass from Jordan Ta'amu (two-point pass fails), 5:18. 6–6. Drive: 12 plays, 89 yards, 6:32.
- MICH – Siaosi Mariner 38-yard pass from Bryce Perkins (Bryce Perkins-Siaosi Mariner one-point pass), 1:21. Panthers 13–6. Drive: 7 plays, 74 yards, 3:59.

Second quarter

- DC – Matt McCrane 22-yard field goal, 13:48. Panthers 13–9. Drive: 6 plays, 76 yards, 2:28.
- DC – Cornell Powell 19-yard pass from Jordan Ta'amu (two-point pass fails), 9:30. Defenders 15–13. Drive: 4 plays, 63 yards, 2:06.
- DC – Jordan Ta'amu 1-yard rush (Jordan Ta'amu-Briley Moore two-point pass), 7:20. Defenders 23–13. Drive: 4 plays, 7 yards, 2:03.
- DC – Deon Jackson 5-yard rush (Jaydon Mickens-Jordan Ta'amu two-point pass), 1:35. Defenders 31–13. Drive: 8 plays, 54 yards, 3:50.
- MICH – Malik Turner 71-yard pass from Bryce Perkins (three-point rush fails), 1:07. Defenders 31–19. Drive: 2 plays, 84 yards, 0:41.
- DC – Ty Scott 73-yard pass from Jordan Ta'amu (two-point pass fails), 0:38. Defenders 37–19. Drive: 3 plays, 85 yards, 0:22.

Third quarter

- DC – Matt McCrane 38-yard field goal, 10:53. Defenders 40–19. Drive: 9 plays, 40 yards, 4:10.
- DC – Deon Jackson 17-yard rush (one-point rush fails), 8:24. Defenders 46–19. Drive: 3 plays, 31 yards, 1:04.

Fourth quarter

- DC – Briley Moore 1-yard pass from Jordan Ta'amu (two-point pass fails), 15:00. Defenders 52–19. Drive: 10 plays, 74 yards, 6:08.
- MICH – Malik Turner 26-yard pass from Bryce Perkins (two-point pass fails), 12:20. Defenders 52–25. Drive: 6 plays, 63 yards, 2:46.
- MICH – Malik Turner 4-yard pass from Bryce Perkins (two-point rush fails), 9:59. Defenders 52–31. Drive: 5 plays, 72 yards, 2:13.
- MICH – B. T. Potter 49-yard field goal, 5:52. Defenders 52–34. Drive: 7 plays, 41 yards, 4:10.
- DC – Chris Rowland 19-yard rush (one-point rush fails), 3:40. Defenders 58–34. Drive: 4 plays, 28 yards, 2:08.

Top passers

- DC – Jordan Ta'amu – 21/28, 390 yards, 4 TD
- MICH – Bryce Perkins – 21/35, 338 yards, 4 TD, 1 INT

Top rushers

- DC – Abram Smith – 10 rushes, 63 yards
- MICH – Nate McCrary – 6 rushes, 62 yards, TD

Top receivers

- DC – Jaydon Mickens – 6 receptions, 132 yards, TD
- MICH – Malik Turner – 10 receptions, 168 yards, 3 TD

== Statistics ==
Team statistical comparison
Statistic	Michigan	DC
Total plays–net yards	55–434	64–580
Rushing attempts–net yards	18–104	35–190
Yards per rush	5.8	5.4
Yards passing	338	390
Pass completions–attempts	21–35	21–28
Interceptions thrown	1	0
Punt returns–total yards	0–0	2–5
Kickoff returns–total yards	9–182	1–5
Punts–average yardage	3–42.7	0–0
Fumbles–lost	2–1	3–0
Time of possession	27:31	32:29

Michigan statistics
Panthers passing
	C–A	Yds	TD–INT
Bryce Perkins	21–35	338	4–1
Panthers rushing
	Car	Yds	TD
Nate McCrary	6	62	1
Toa Taua	8	34	0
Bryce Perkins	4	8	0
Panthers receiving
	Rec	Yds	TD
Malik Turner	10	168	3
Siaosi Mariner	4	84	1
Devin Ross	3	41	0
Cole Hikutini	1	22	0
Toa Taua	2	17	0
Noah Johnson	1	6	0

DC statistics
Defenders passing
	C–A	Yds	TD–INT
Jordan Ta'amu	21–28	390	4–0
Defenders rushing
	Car	Yds	TD
Abram Smith	10	63	0
Chris Rowland	6	53	1
Deon Jackson	11	46	2
Jordan Ta'amu	8	28	1
Defenders receiving
	Rec	Yds	TD
Jaydon Mickens	6	132	1
Ty Scott	1	73	1
Seth Williams	1	46	0
Chris Rowland	5	45	0
Braylon Sanders	3	41	0
Cornell Powell	2	26	1
Mason Fairchild	1	14	0
Briley Moore	2	13	1

== See also ==
- UFL Championship Game
- USFL Championship Game
- XFL Championship Game
