= 2023 XFL Championship Game =

American football game in San Antonio, Texas

2023 XFL championship game
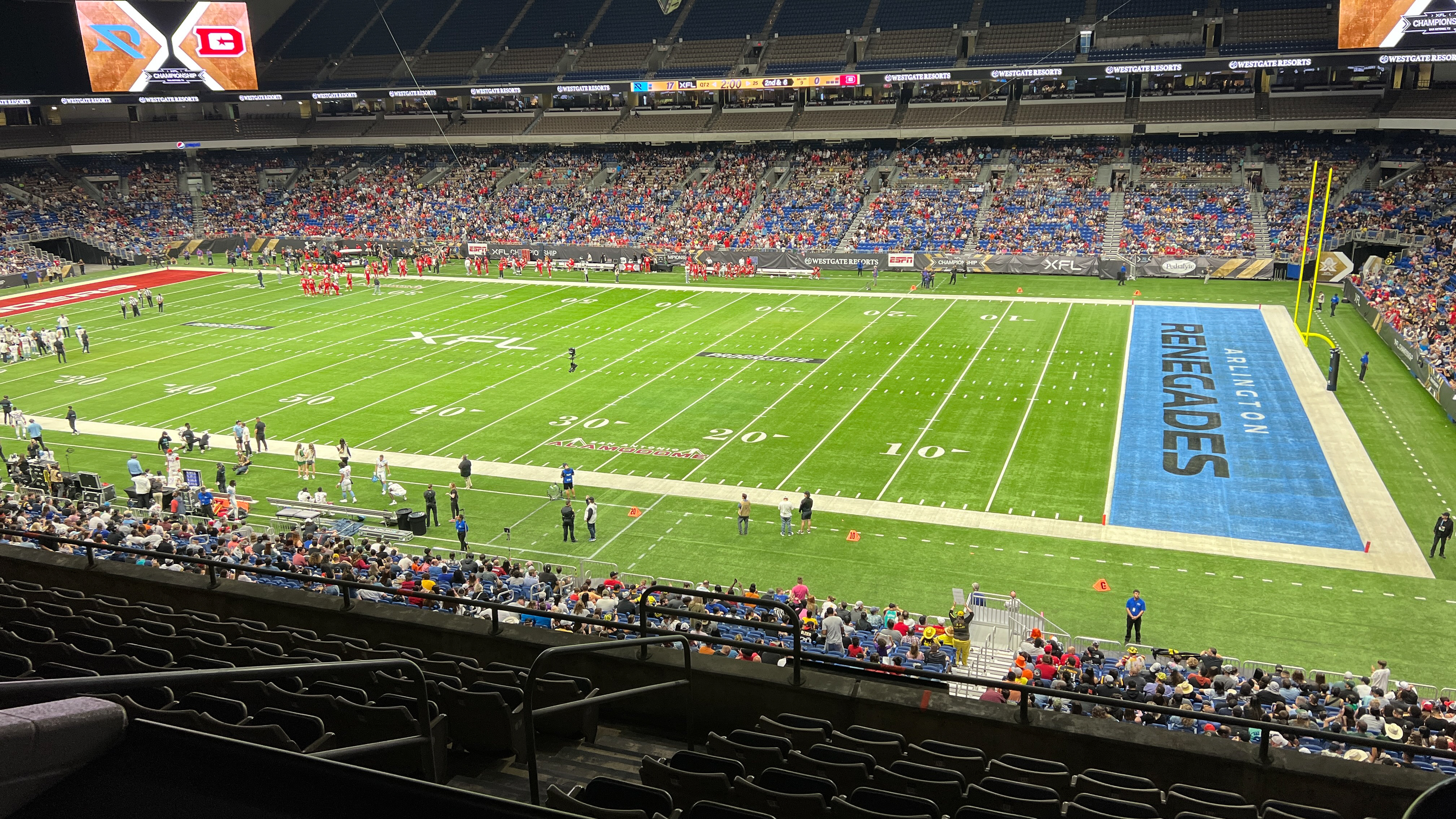
- Alamodome during the game
| DC Defenders (9–1) | Arlington Renegades (4–6) |
|---|---|
| 26 | 35 |
| Head coach: Reggie Barlow | Head coach: Bob Stoops |
| | 1 | 2 | 3 | 4 | Total |
|---|---|---|---|---|---|
| DC | 0 | 6 | 14 | 6 | 26 |
| ARL | 14 | 6 | 12 | 3 | 35 |
- Date: May 13, 2023
- Kickoff time: 8:00 p.m. EDT (UTC-4)
- Stadium: Alamodome; San Antonio, Texas
- MVP: Luis Perez, Arlington
- Favorite: DC by 8.5
- Referee: Michael VanderVelde
- Attendance: 22,754

TV in the United States
- Network: ABC
- Announcers: Tom Hart, Greg McElroy, Cole Cubelic and Katie George
- Nielsen ratings: 0.8 (1.40 million viewers)

The 2023 XFL championship game was an American football game on May 13, 2023, at the Alamodome in San Antonio, Texas. The contest determined the champion of the 2023 XFL season and was played between the South Division title winners Arlington Renegades and the North Division title winners DC Defenders. The game began at 8:00 p.m. EDT and was aired on ABC.

== Background ==
The game was the first and only championship game of the second stint of the XFL as a standalone league. In the first stint of the XFL, there was only one championship game held, the Million Dollar Game in 2001. The league folded shortly after the game was played. A championship game was scheduled for the end of the 2020 XFL season but was forbidden from taking place due to stay-at-home orders and gathering restrictions tied to the COVID-19 pandemic, which forced the premature end of the 2020 season after five weeks of play.

=== Host selection ===
On February 19, 2023, the Alamodome was selected as host for the first edition of the championship. The Alamodome is a 64,000-seat venue in the southeastern fringe of Downtown San Antonio. Opened in May 1993, the stadium is home to one of the XFL's own teams, San Antonio Brahmas. The stadium is also known as the home stadium for the UTSA Roadrunners football program and the annual Alamo Bowl.

=== XFL playoffs ===
The four teams competing in the playoff clinched their spot during their regular season during different times of the overall season of the league. The top two placed teams in each division would face against each other for the division title. Whichever division title game team won, would then face the other champion from the other division in the XFL Championship Game. Both DC Defenders and Houston Roughnecks clinched their spot after Week 8. Lastly, both Arlington Renegades and Seattle Sea Dragons clinched their spot after Seattle won their last regular season game and San Antonio lost their last regular season game. Controversy began as St. Louis Battlehawks were eliminated from the playoffs at the end of the season and had a higher overall record than Arlington Renegades (yet being in two separate divisions), the Battlehawks placed third in the North division after failing the tie-breakers against the Seattle Sea Dragons.

The Division Finals were played on April 29 and April 30, 2023. In the South Division Final title game, Arlington Renegades upset Houston Roughnecks as 6.5 point underdogs, 26–11. In the North Division Final title game, DC Defenders defeated Seattle Sea Dragons 37–21.

==== Bracket ====
Division Finals; April 29–30, 2023
N1 | DC Defenders | 37
N2 | Seattle Sea Dragons | 21
S1 | Houston Roughnecks | 11
S2 | Arlington Renegades | 26

XFL Championship; May 13, 2023
N1 | DC Defenders | 26
S2 | Arlington Renegades | 35

== Teams ==
=== DC Defenders ===
DC Defenders finished their second overall season under head coach Reggie Barlow, going 9–1 and advancing to their first playoff berth to the division title game against Seattle Sea Dragons.

=== Arlington Renegades ===
Arlington Renegades finished their second overall season under head coach Bob Stoops, going 4–6 and advancing to their first playoff berth to the division title game against Houston Roughnecks (South Division leaders).

== Game summary ==
=== Scoring summary ===
2023 XFL championship game

| Quarter | 1 | 2 | 3 | 4 | Total |
|---|---|---|---|---|---|
| DC Defenders | 14 | 6 | 12 | 3 | 35 |
| Arlington Renegades | 0 | 6 | 14 | 6 | 26 |

at Alamodome • San Antonio, Texas

- Date: Saturday, May 13, 2023
- Game time: 8:00 p.m. EDT
- Game weather: 76 °F (24 °C)
- Game attendance: 22,754
- Referee: Michael VanderVelde
- TV announcers (ABC): Tom Hart, Greg McElroy, Cole Cubelic and Katie George

Game information

First quarter

- ARL – Sal Cannella 41-yard pass from Luis Perez (2-pt Conversion No Good), 11:00. Renegades 6–0. Drive: 2 Plays, 59 Yards, 4:02.
- ARL – Tyler Vaughns 9-yard pass from Luis Perez (2-pt Conversion Good De'Veon Smith), 0:29. Renegades 14–0. Drive: 16 Plays, 88 Yards, 8:45.

Second quarter

- ARL – Taylor Russolino 29-yard field goal, 4:54. Renegades 17–0. Drive: 13 Plays, 54 Yards, 6:50.
- DC – Abram Smith 2-yard rush (2-pt Conversion No Good), 0:32. Renegades 17–6. Drive: 10 Plays, 45 Yards, 4:22.
- ARL – Taylor Russolino 51-yard field goal, 0:02. Renegades 20–6. Drive: 3 Plays, 12 Yards, 0:30.

Third quarter

- DC – Abram Smith 52-yard rush (2-pt Conversion No Good), 11:42. Renegades 20–12. Drive: 7 Plays, 71 Yards, 3:27.
- ARL – Leddie Brown 7-yard rush (1-pt Conversion No Good), 4:44. Renegades 26–12. Drive: 12 Plays, 71 Yards, 6:49.
- DC – Josh Hammond 72-yard pass from Jordan Ta'amu (2-pt Conversion Good by Abram Smith), 0:06. Renegades 26–20. Drive: 2 Plays, 70 Yards, 0:42.
- ARL – Leddie Brown 30-yard pass from Luis Perez (1-pt Conversion No Good), 0:00. Renegades 32–20. Drive: 1 Play, 30 Yards, 0:06.

Fourth quarter

- ARL – Taylor Russolino 33-yard field goal, 9:56. Renegades 35–20. Drive: 7 Plays, 8 Yards, 3:40.
- DC – Josh Hammond 24-yard pass from Jordan Ta'amu (2-pt Conversion No Good), 1:17. Renegades 35–26. Drive: 7 Plays, 78 Yards, 0:45.

Top passers

- ARL – Luis Perez – 26/36, 288 yards, 3 TD
- DC – Jordan Ta'amu – 16/30, 245 yards, 2 TD

Top rushers

- ARL – De'Veon Smith – 15 rushes, 54 yards
- DC – Abram Smith – 13 rushes, 90 yards

Top receivers

- ARL – Tyler Vaughns – 8 receptions, 83 yards
- DC – Josh Hammond – 6 receptions, 127 yards

== Statistics ==
Team statistical comparison
| Statistic | DC | Arlington |
|---|---|---|
| First downs | 17 | 26 |
| First downs rushing | 6 | 9 |
| First downs passing | 11 | 16 |
| First downs penalty | 0 | 1 |
| Third down efficiency | 4–8 | 11–15 |
| Fourth down efficiency | 1–2 | 0–0 |
| Total plays–net yards | 49–356 | 71–396 |
| Rushing attempts–net yards | 17–115 | 34–111 |
| Yards per rush | 6.8 | 3.3 |
| Yards passing | 241 | 285 |
| Pass completions–attempts | 16–30 | 26–36 |
| Interceptions thrown | 3 | 0 |
| Punt returns–total yards | 1–6 | 3–14 |
| Kickoff returns–total yards | – | – |
| Punts–average yardage | 3–52 | 1–54 |
| Fumbles–lost | 0–0 | 1–1 |
| Penalties–yards | 4–50 | 4–34 |
| Time of possession | 20:24 | 39:36 |

DC statistics
Defenders passing
| | C–A | Yds | TD–INT |
|---|---|---|---|
| Jordan Ta'amu | 16–30 | 245 | 2–3 |
Defenders rushing
| | Car | Yds | TD |
| Abram Smith | 13 | 90 | 2 |
| Jordan Ta'amu | 4 | 25 | 0 |
Defenders receiving
| | Rec | Yds | TD |
| Josh Hammond | 6 | 127 | 2 |
| Lucky Jackson | 2 | 33 | 0 |
| Chris Blair | 3 | 29 | 0 |
| Abram Smith | 2 | 28 | 0 |
| Alex Ellis | 2 | 17 | 0 |
| Briley Moore | 1 | 11 | 0 |

Arlington statistics
Renegades passing
| | C–A | Yds | TD–INT |
|---|---|---|---|
| Luis Perez | 26–36 | 288 | 3–0 |
Renegades rushing
| | Car | Yds | TD |
| De'Veon Smith | 15 | 54 | 0 |
| Leddie Brown | 9 | 32 | 1 |
| Kelly Bryant | 4 | 15 | 0 |
| Luis Perez | 6 | 10 | 0 |
Renegades receiving
| | Rec | Yds | TD |
| Tyler Vaughns | 8 | 83 | 1 |
| Sal Cannella | 4 | 71 | 1 |
| Leddie Brown | 2 | 43 | 1 |
| Brandon Arconado | 4 | 25 | 0 |
| Caleb Vander Esch | 3 | 21 | 0 |
| JaVonta Payton | 2 | 21 | 0 |
| LuJuan Winningham | 2 | 16 | 0 |
| Victor Bolden Jr. | 1 | 8 | 0 |

== Aftermath ==
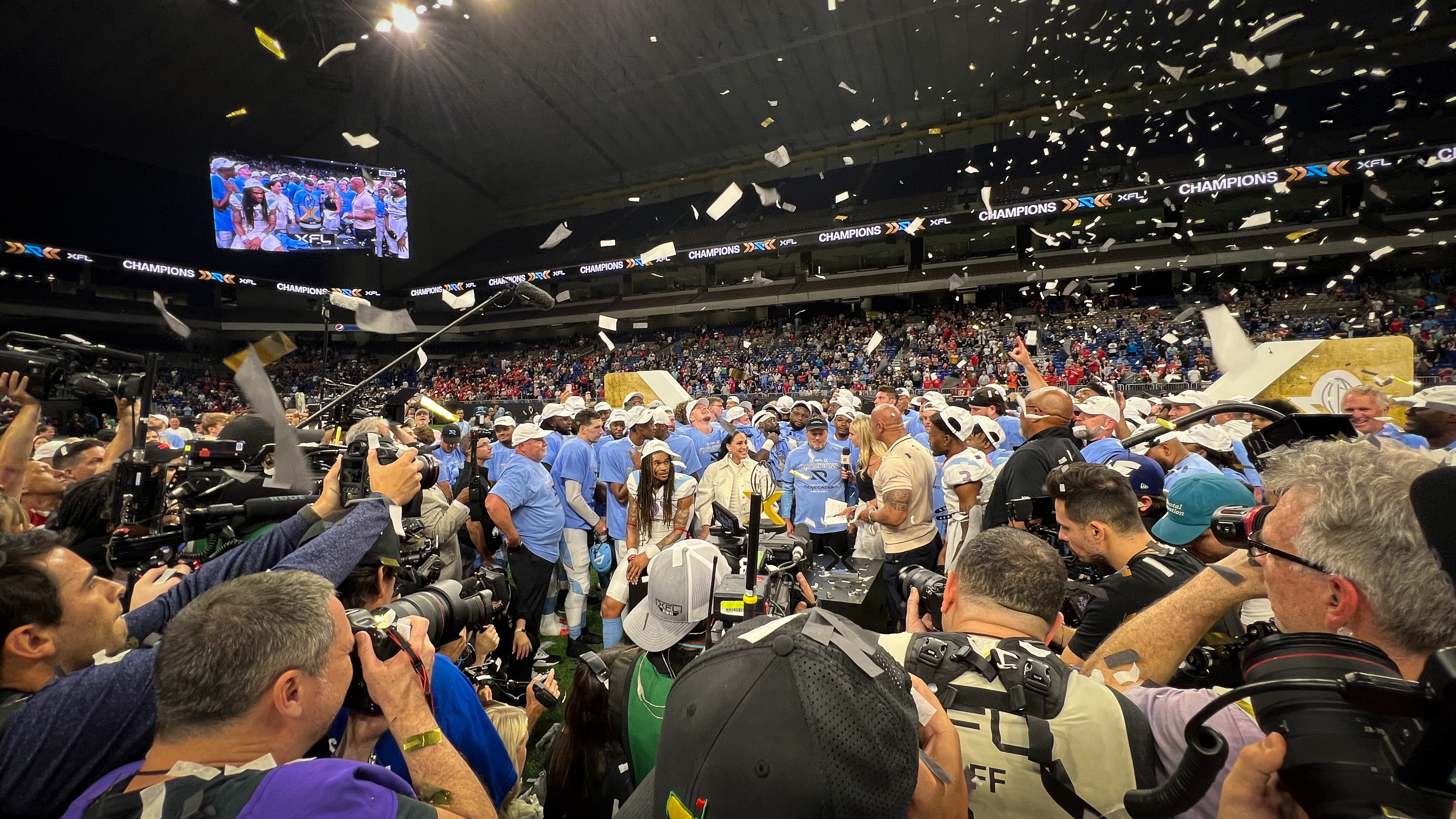
The Arlington Renegades celebrate on the field after winning the 2023 XFL Championship.

Renegades quarterback Luis Perez, previously named to the all-XFL team, was named the game's Most Valuable Player. In accordance with the XFL's incentive-based pay structure, Perez and the rest of the Renegades roster won $12,500 per player for their victory.

After the game, ABC has officially announced that the league would return in February 2024, featuring the same eight teams that competed during the 2023 season. On December 31, 2023, the XFL merged with a competing league, the United States Football League, to form the United Football League, thereby contracting four of the teams from each league but keeping each entity alive as separate conferences; on February 5, 2024, the league announced along with its schedule that separate USFL and XFL Championship Games would continue to be held as part of its playoff structure, with the winners of each moving on to the 2024 UFL Championship.

== See also ==
- United Bowl
- USFL Championship Game
- XFL Championship Game
