= Reggie Barlow =

American football player and coach (born 1972)

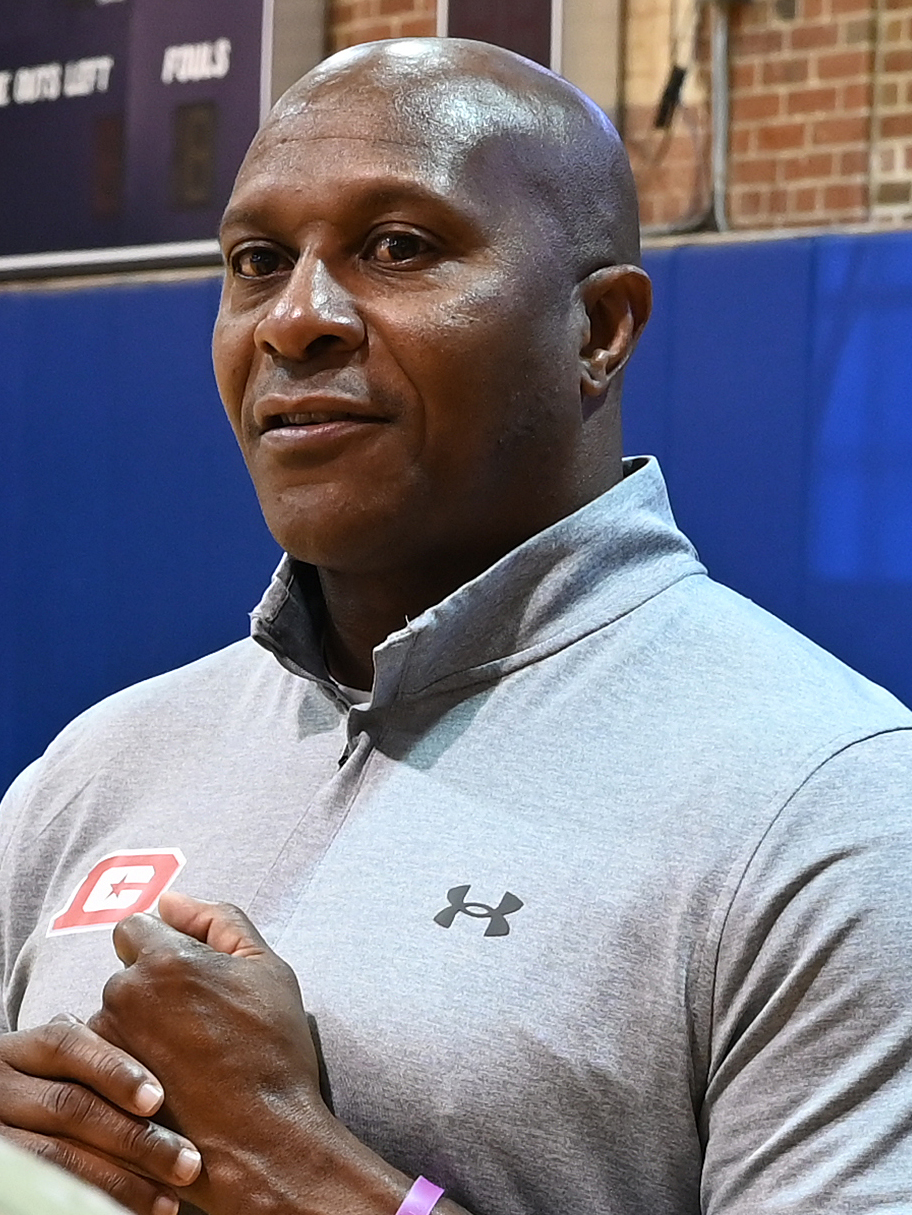
- Barlow in 2022

Tennessee State Tigers
- Title: Head coach

Personal information
- Born: January 22, 1972 (age 54); Montgomery, Alabama, U.S.
- Listed height: 6 ft 0 in (1.83 m)
- Listed weight: 190 lb (86 kg)

Career information
- High school: Sidney Lanier (Montgomery)
- College: Alabama State
- NFL draft: 1996: 4th round, 110th overall pick

Career history

Playing
- Jacksonville Jaguars (1996–2000); Oakland Raiders (2001); Tampa Bay Buccaneers (2002–2003)

Coaching
- Alabama State (2005–2006) Quarterbacks coach; Alabama State (2007–2014) Head coach; Virginia State (2016–2021) Head coach; DC Defenders (2023–2024) Head coach; Tennessee State (2025–present) Head coach

Awards and highlights
- As player: Super Bowl champion (XXXVII); As coach: XFL Coach of the Year (2023); 2× Black College National (2011, 2017); CIAA (2017); 3× SWAC East Division (2010–2012); CIAA Northern Division (2017)

Career NFL statistics
- Receptions: 39
- Receiving yards: 522
- Receiving touchdowns: 1
- Stats at Pro Football Reference

Head coaching record
- Regular season: College: 85–68 (.556); XFL/UFL: 13–7 (.650)
- Postseason: College: 0–1 (.000); XFL/UFL: 1–1 (.500)
- Career: College: 85–68 (.556); XFL/UFL: 14–8 (.636)

Reggie Devon Barlow (born January 22, 1972) is an American former professional football player and coach who is currently the head coach for Tennessee State University.

Barlow was previously the head coach of the DC Defenders of the United Football League (UFL). Barlow served as the head football coach at Alabama State University from 2007 to 2014 and at Virginia State University from 2016 to 2021. He played professionally as a wide receiver in the National Football League (NFL) for eight seasons, five for the Jacksonville Jaguars, two for the Tampa Bay Buccaneers, and one with the Oakland Raiders. He was used as a secondary wide receiver and punt returner. In 1997, Barlow led the NFL in punt return yards with 555 yards on 43 returns.

== College career ==
A record-breaking receiver and kick returner, Barlow was recruited to Alabama State University by coach Houston Markham. During his senior year at Alabama State, Barlow caught 58 passes for 1,267 yards. The Montgomery, Alabama, native and Sidney Lanier High School standout finished his collegiate career with 133 catches and 2,536 yards.

== Professional career ==
Pre-draft measurables
Height	Weight	Arm length	Hand span	40-yard dash	10-yard split	20-yard split	20-yard shuttle	Vertical jump
5 ft 11 2/8 in (1.81 m)	187 lb (85 kg)	33 1/8 in (0.84 m)	8 3/4 in (0.22 m)	4.59 s	1.61 s	2.68 s	4.20 s	32.5 in (0.83 m)

Barlow was selected in the fourth round of the 1996 NFL draft by the Jacksonville Jaguars.

In 1998, Barlow led the NFL in punt return yardage, with 43 returns for 555 yards and a touchdown and was named a Pro Bowl alternate. He still ranks among the Jaguars' career leaders for most punt returns (79), most punt return yards (967), and average per return (12.2), as well as among the all-time single-season leaders in punt return yardage (555 in 1998, tied for 37th best all-time as of 2014). In the Jaguars 1998 playoff win against the New England Patriots, Barlow had 3 kickoff returns for 66 yards and 7 punt returns for 72. One week later, Barlow returned 3 kickoffs for 118 yards, one of them an 88-yard runback, and 1 punt for 5 yards in a divisional round loss to the New York Jets. After five years in Jacksonville, Barlow joined the Oakland Raiders. In 2002, Barlow began his two-year tenure with the Tampa Bay Buccaneers, where he won a championship ring in Super Bowl XXXVII.

Barlow ended his NFL career with 39 receptions for 522 yards and 1 touchdown. His largest statistical contributions were made on kickoff and punt returns. Barlow returned 80 career kickoffs for 1,855 yards and 1 touchdown, and 158 punts for 1,639 yards and 2 touchdowns.

== Coaching career ==
=== Alabama State ===
Barlow joined the Alabama State Hornets football staff as quarterbacks coach in 2005. In his first season, Barlow served as mentor and tutor to future NFL second-round draftee Tarvaris Jackson.

In 2006, Barlow worked with a trio of quarterbacks without a single snap of college football experience between them. Under Barlow's tutelage, Alex Engram earned a Southwestern Athletic Conference (SWAC) Newcomer of the Week award and finished eighth in the conference in total offense.

After that season, Barlow was named interim head coach. A few weeks later, the interim title was removed. Barlow took over as head coach in 2007 and compiled an overall record of 49–42 in eight season as head coach at Alabama State. In 2010, the Hornets went 7–5, claimed their fourth outright SWAC Eastern Divisional title, and made their third trip to the league's championship game in eight seasons. In 2011, the Hornets improved to 8–3, winning the Turkey Day Classic over Tuskegee.

Barlow has coached a few current and former NFL players, including Seattle Seahawks quarterback Tarvaris Jackson, who was a member of the Super Bowl XLVIII Championship team, Cleveland Browns running back Isaiah Crowell, and Washington Redskins offensive tackle Terren Jones, as well as former Oakland Raiders receiver Greg Jenkins and former Baltimore Ravens linebacker Nigel Carr.

In 2014, after the completion of the school's football season, the Alabama State University Board of Trustees voted not to renew Barlow's contract. The move was seen as controversial because Barlow had signed a contract-extension and salary increase months prior and had already begun getting paid at the higher rate. Litigation in the contract dispute resulted in the judge finding in favor of ASU in December 2015. The Hornets football team finished 7–5 on the season. This was Barlow's fifth consecutive winning season and his 49 career wins rank him second all-time among coaches in program history.

=== George Washington Carver High School ===
In December 2015, it was announced that Barlow had agreed in principle to become head football coach at George Washington Carver High School in Columbus, Georgia. Just a few months later, however, Barlow was mentioned as a candidate for the head football coaching job at his alma mater, Sidney Lanier High School.

=== Virginia State ===
In May 2016, Barlow accepted the head coaching position at Virginia State University. During his tenure at Virginia State, Barlow posted a 34–15 overall record and a 25–10 conference record. In 2017, he led the Trojans to their first unbeaten season in school history, going 10–0 and defeating Fayetteville State to win the CIAA championship and a berth in the Division II playoffs. Barlow resigned from Virginia State in March 2022.

=== DC Defenders (XFL) ===
Barlow took a position with the XFL in March 2022. Barlow was initially expected to become the head coach for the San Antonio franchise, but in June 2022, it was instead reported that Barlow would coach the DC Defenders.

Barlow finished his first season with the Defenders 9–1, winning the 2023 XFL Head Coach of the Year Award.

Tennessee State

On March 23, 2025, Barlow was hired as head coach for the Tennessee State Tigers. Barlow took over the program after Eddie George was hired by Bowling Green following the 2024 season.

== Personal life ==
Barlow is the father of three children: Ericka, Reggie Jr., and Simone, and the grandfather of one: Tyler Grace.

== Head coaching record ==
=== College career ===
Year	Team	Overall	Conference	Standing	Bowl/playoffs
Alabama State Hornets (Southwestern Athletic Conference) (2007–2014)
2007	Alabama State	5–6	4–5	3rd (East)	
2008	Alabama State	3–8	2–5	3rd (East)	
2009	Alabama State	4–7	1–6	T–4th (East)	
2010	Alabama State	7–5	6–3	T–1st (East)	
2011	Alabama State	8–3	7–2	T–1st (East)	
2012	Alabama State	7–4	7–2	T–1st (East)	
2013	Alabama State	8–4	7–2	T–2nd (East)	
2014	Alabama State	7–5	5–4	2nd (East)	
Alabama State:		49–42	38–28		
Virginia State Trojans (Central Intercollegiate Athletic Association) (2016–2021)
2016	Virginia State	9–2	5–2	2nd (Northern)	
2017	Virginia State	10–1	7–0	1st (Northern)	L NCAA Division II First Round
2018	Virginia State	4–5	4–3	4th (Northern)	
2019	Virginia State	8–2	6–1	2nd (Northern)	
2020–21	No team—COVID-19				
2021	Virginia State	3–6	3–4	T–4th (Northern)	
Virginia State:		34–16	25–10		
Tennessee State Tigers (OVC–Big South Football Association) (2025–present)
2025	Tennessee State	2–10	0–8	9th	
Tennessee State:		2–10	0–8		
Total:		85–68			
National championship Conference title Conference division title or championship game berth

=== XFL/UFL ===
League	Team	Year	Regular season				Postseason			
League	Team	Year	Won	Lost	Win %	Finish	Won	Lost	Win %	Result
XFL	DC	2023	9	1	.900	1st XFL North	1	1	.500	Lost to Arlington Renegades in 2023 XFL Championship Game
UFL	DC	2024	4	6	.400	Did not qualify	–	–	–	–
Total			13	7	.650		1	1	.500	
