= 2022 Tampa Bay Bandits season =

American professional football season

- General manager: Todd Haley
- Head coach: Todd Haley
- Home stadium: None

Results
- Record: 4–6
- League place: 3rd in South Division
- Playoffs: Did not qualify

The 2022 Tampa Bay Bandits season was the first and only season for the Tampa Bay Bandits as a professional American football franchise. They played as charter members of the United States Football League, one of eight teams to compete in the league for the 2022 season. The Bandits technically played as a traveling team (since the entirety of the regular season was played at Protective Stadium and Legion Field in Birmingham, Alabama) and were led by head coach Todd Haley.

== Final roster ==
2022 Tampa Bay Bandits roster
Quarterbacks (QB): 10 Jordan Ta'amu; 3 Brady White; Running backs (RB): 28 B. J. Emmons; 27 Tra Minter; 29 Juwan Washington; Wide receivers (WR): 18 Dee Anderson; 81 Rashard Davis; 4 Derrick Dillon; 80 Hasise DuBois; 13 Vinny Papale; 11 Derrick Willies; Tight ends (TE): 88 De'Quan Hampton; 85 C. J. O'Grady	Offensive linemen (OL): 72 Jalen Booth T; 73 Juwann Bushell-Beatty T; 64 Fred Lauina G; 51 Damien Mama G/C; 67 Darrin Paulo T; 75 Dallas Warmack G; Defensive linemen (DL): 99 John Atkins DT; 8 Zac Daew DE; 92 Sulaiman Kamara DT; 94 Daylon Mack DT; 33 Jeff McCulloch DE; 90 Austrian Robinson DT; 55 Mike Scott DE; 98 Jeremiah Valoaga DE	Linebackers (LB): 43 Emmanuel Beal; 50 Anthony Butler; 56 Travis Feeney; 5 T. J. Neal; 41 Greg Reaves; Defensive backs (DB): 21 Delrick Abrams CB; 2 Rashard Causey CB; 22 Anthony Cioffi S; 40 Stephen Griffin S; 24 Jermaine Kelly CB; 42 Antonio Reed S; Special teams (ST): 44 Ryan DiSalvo LS; 16 Brandon Wright P/K	Practice squad: 70 Matt Burrell C; 7 Christian Campbell CB; 1 John Franklin WR; 9 Rannell Hall WR; 77 Jarron Jones T; 30 Quenton Meeks CB; 20 Obi Melifonwu S; 25 Keith Mumphery WR; 9 Guy Myers QB; 12 Tyler Rausa K; Reserve: -- Tyler Catalina T (DNR); 65 Corbin Kaufusi T (IR); 61 Bruno Reagan C (IR); -- Eli Rogers WR (DNR); -- Adam Shuler DE (DNR); Rookies in italics 40 active, 5 reserve, 10 practice squad

== Staff ==
2022 Tampa Bay Bandits staff
Front office: General manager – Todd Haley; Head coaches: Head coach – Todd Haley; Offensive coaches: Offensive coordinator - Bob Saunders; Running backs/wide receivers - Yale Van Dyne; Tight ends/special teams - Frank Gansz Jr.; Offensive line - Pat Perles	Defensive coaches: Defensive coordinator/defensive line - Pepper Johnson; Linebackers - Trey Jackson; Defensive backs - Carnell Lake; Defensive assistant - Steven Thompson

== Schedule ==
=== Regular season ===
The Bandits' 2022 schedule was announced on March 7. They opened the season against the Pittsburgh Maulers.

Week	Date	Time (ET)	Opponent	Result	Record	TV	Recap
1	April 18	7:00 p.m.	Pittsburgh Maulers	**W** 17–3	1–0	FS1	Recap
2	April 24	3:00 p.m.	**New Orleans Breakers***	**L** 3–34	1–1	NBC/Peacock	Recap
3	April 30	4:00 p.m.	**Houston Gamblers**	**W** 27–26	2–1	Fox	Recap
4	May 7	7:00 p.m.	**Birmingham Stallions**	**L** 10–16	2–2	Fox	Recap
5	May 13	8:00 p.m.	Michigan Panthers*	**W** 27–20	3–2	USA	Recap
6	May 21	1:00 p.m.	Philadelphia Stars	**L** 28–35	3–3	NBC/Peacock	Recap
7	May 28	12:00 p.m.	New Jersey Generals*	**L** 13–20	3–4	USA	Recap
8	June 5	4:00 p.m.	**Houston Gamblers***	**W** 13–3	4–4	Peacock	Recap
9	June 12	4:00 p.m.	**New Orleans Breakers**	**L** 6–17	4–5	Fox	Recap
10	June 18	4:00 p.m.	**Birmingham Stallions***	**L** 18–21	4–6	Fox	Recap

Note: Intra-division opponents are in bold text. * mean that they host the game, since all eight teams play at the same stadium

=== Game summaries ===
==== Week 1: at Pittsburgh Maulers ====
Week 1: Tampa Bay Bandits at Pittsburgh Maulers – Game summary

Quarter	1	2	3	4	Total
**Bandits**	10	7	0	0	**17**
Maulers	0	0	3	0	**3**

at Protective Stadium, Birmingham, Alabama

- Date: April 18 (delayed)
- Game time: 7:00 p.m.
- Referee: Bryan Banks
- TV announcers (FS1): Curt Menefee, Joel Klatt, Brock Huard
- Recap

Game information

**First quarter**

- TB – B. J. Emmons 3-yard run (Tyler Rausa kick), 10:49. Bandits 7–0. **Drive: 8 plays, 68 yards, 4:11.**
- TB – Tyler Rausa 23-yard field goal, 1:06. Bandits 10–0. **Drive: 10 plays, 54 yards, 4:50.**

**Second quarter**

- TB – Jordan Lasley 3-yard pass from Jordan Ta'amu (Tyler Rausa kick), 1:17. Bandits 17–0. **Drive: 8 plays, 38 yards, 3;28.**

**Third quarter**

- PIT – Ramiz Ahmed 28-yard field goal, 4:25. Bandits 17–3. **Drive: 10 plays, 46 yards, 4:55.**

**Fourth quarter**

- No scoring plays

**Top passers**

- TB – Jordan Ta'amu – 20/32, 185 yards, TD, 2 INT
- PIT – Josh Love – 9/16, 121 yards

**Top rushers**

- TB – B. J. Emmons – 19 rushes, 40 yards, TD
- PIT – Garrett Groshek – 16 rushes, 55 yards

**Top receivers**

- TB – Cheyenne O'Grady – 8 receptions, 86 yards
- PIT – Jeff Thomas – 4 receptions, 43 yards

The Bandits started their season against the Pittsburgh Maulers. The Bandits dominated the first half, scoring 17 unanswered points with 2 touchdowns and a 23 yard field goal. On the Bandits first drive of the game, they drove downfield 68 yards to score with a B. J. Emmons 3 yard rushing touchdown. The teams would trade punts until what would be the Bandits last drive of the first quarter saw them drive 54 yards down field and kick a 23 yard field goal to put them up 10-0 at the end of the first. The teams traded punts again until near the end of the second quarter when a short punt by the Maulers put them at the Pittsburgh's 38 yard line. The drive ended when Jordan Ta'amu threw a 3 yard touchdown pass to Jordan Lasley to put the Bandits up 17-0 heading into the half, which would be the only points Tampa would score. The second half saw the Maulers drive 46 yards to hit a 28 yard field goal to put the Bandits at 17-3, which would be the final score.

==== Week 2: vs New Orleans Breakers ====
Week 2: New Orleans Breakers at Tampa Bay Bandits – Game summary

Quarter	1	2	3	4	Total
**Breakers**	14	7	0	13	**34**
Bandits	0	3	0	0	**3**

at Protective Stadium, Birmingham, Alabama

- Date: April 24
- Game time: 3:00 p.m. EDT
- Referee: Alex Moore
- TV announcers (NBC/Peacock): Jac Collinsworth, Jason Garrett, Lewis Johnson

Game information
**First quarter**
- NO – Kyle Sloter 1-yard rush (Austin MacGinnis kick no good), 7:32. Breakers 6–0. **13 plays, 79 yards, 5:44.**
- NO – T. J. Logan 5-yard rush (Kyle Sloter pass good), 0:15. Breakers 14–0. **12 plays, 70 yards, 5:42.**

**Second quarter**

- BIRM – Tyler Rausa 21-yard field goal, 5:54. Breakers 14–3. **11 plays, 69 yards, 6:20.**
- NO – Shawn Poindexter 18-yard pass from Kyle Sloter (Austin MacGinnis kick good), 2:28. Breakers 21–3. **7 plays, 56 yards, 3:23.**

**Fourth quarter**

- NO – Austin MacGinnis 22-yard field goal, 14:49. Breakers 24–3. **10 plays, 55 yards, 2:54.**
- NO – Johnnie Dixon 4-yard pass from Kyle Sloter (Austin MacGinnis kick good), 11:33. Breakers 31–3. **5 plays, 31 yards, 1:50.**
- NO – Austin MacGinnis 30-yard field goal, 1:11. Breakers 34–3. **4 plays, 7 yards, 1:44.**

The Bandits faced their division rival New Orleans Breakers. The Breakers struck first on a 79 yard touchdown drive, but the extra point was missed, putting the Bandits down at 0-6. After a Bandits punt, the Breakers marched 65 yards downfield to score another touchdown, converting a 2-point conversion to bring the Bandits down 0-14. The Bandits responded in the second quarter with a 69 yard field goal drive capped off by a 21-yard field goal by Tyler Rausa to bring the Bandits to 3-14. The Breakers responded with a 56 yard touchdown drive to put the Bandits down two scores at 3-21.

In the second half, the Bandits turned it over on downs while the Breakers were unable to score. In the fourth quarter, the Breakers extended to a 3 score lead after a 22 yard field goal. They triumphed more, scoring a touchdown off a Ta'amu interception, putting them at a commanding 3-31 margin. They then made a 30-yard field goal to put them at 3-34 with a little over a minute, which would be the final score.

==== Week 3: at Houston Gamblers ====
Week 3: Tampa Bay Bandits at Houston Gamblers – Game summary

Quarter	1	2	3	4	Total
**Bandits**	7	7	3	10	**27**
Gamblers	10	13	3	0	**26**

at Protective Stadium, Birmingham, Alabama

- Date: April 30
- Game time: 4:00 p.m. EDT
- Referee: James Carter
- TV announcers (Fox): Kevin Kugler, Mark Sanchez, Brock Huard

The Bandits will play against division rival Houston Gamblers.

== Standings ==
South Division
#		W	L	PCT	GB	DIV	PF	PA	STK
1	(y) Birmingham Stallions	9	1	.900	–	5–1	234	169	W1
2	(x) New Orleans Breakers	6	4	.600	3	3–3	196	164	L1
3	(e) Tampa Bay Bandits	4	6	.400	5	2–4	162	195	L2
4	(e) Houston Gamblers	3	7	.300	6	2–4	196	208	W2
(x)–clinched playoff berth; (y)–clinched division; (e)–eliminated from playoff contention

=== Postseason ===
Bandits did not make it to the playoffs after a lost against the New Orleans Breakers.
