= 2022 USFL draft =

2022 American football draft

General information
- Date: February 22–23, 2022
- Time: 10:00 AM ET
- Location: Birmingham, Alabama

Overview
- 280 total selections in 35 rounds
- League: USFL

The 2022 USFL draft, also known as the 2022 USFL player selection meeting, was the player selection process to fill the rosters of the eight teams for the 2022 USFL season. The draft was held on February 22–23, 2022, with results released through the USFL's social media channels.

== Structure ==
The USFL player allocation process was held in multiple phases, separated by position groups. The league used a "snake" format in each phase, in which the draft order reversed with each round. The draft order was shuffled for each phase as predetermined through lotteries. A draft pool of 450–500 players were eligible to be picked by signing contracts before the draft. The structure of the draft was as follows:

Day 1:

- Round 1: quarterbacks
- Rounds 2–4: defensive ends
- Round 5–7: offensive tackles
- Round 8–11: cornerbacks
- Round 12: quarterbacks

Day 2:

- Round 13–17: wide receivers
- Round 18–19: safeties
- Round 20: centers
- Round 21: inside linebackers
- Round 22–23: guards
- Round 24–26: defensive tackles
- Round 27–28: running backs
- Round 29–31: outside linebackers
- Round 32: kickers
- Round 33: punters
- Round 34: tight ends
- Round 35: long snappers

Positions key
Offense	Defense	Special teams
QB — Quarterback; RB — Running back; FB — Fullback; WR — Wide receiver; TE — Tight end; OL — Offensive lineman; T — Tackle; G — Guard; C — Center	DL — Defensive lineman; DT — Defensive tackle (Note: Includes nose tackle (NT)); DE — Defensive end; EDGE — Edge rusher; LB — Linebacker (Note: Includes middle linebacker (MLB/MIKE), weakside linebacker (WILL), strongside linebacker (SAM), off-ball linebacker, and outside linebacker (OLB)); DB — Defensive back; CB — Cornerback; S — Safety (Note: Includes free safety (FS) and strong safety (SS))	K — Kicker (Note: Also known as a placekicker (PK)); P — Punter; LS — Long snapper; RS — Return specialist (Note: Includes kickoff and punt returners)

=== Day 1 ===
==== Round 1: quarterbacks ====
Round	Pick #	USFL team	Player	Position	College
1	1	Michigan Panthers	Shea Patterson	QB	Michigan
1	2	Tampa Bay Bandits	Jordan Ta'amu	QB	Ole Miss
1	3	Philadelphia Stars	Bryan Scott	QB	Occidental
1	4	New Jersey Generals	Ben Holmes	QB	Tarleton State
1	5	Houston Gamblers	Clayton Thorson	QB	Northwestern
1	6	Birmingham Stallions	Alex McGough	QB	FIU
1	7	Pittsburgh Maulers	Kyle Lauletta	QB	Richmond
1	8	New Orleans Breakers	Kyle Sloter	QB	Northern Colorado

==== Round 2–4: defensive ends ====
Round	Pick #	USFL team	Player	Position	College
2	9	New Orleans Breakers	Davin Bellamy	DE	Georgia
2	10	Pittsburgh Maulers	Carlo Kemp	DE	Michigan
2	11	Birmingham Stallions	Aaron Adeoye	DE	Southeast Missouri State
2	12	Houston Gamblers	Chris Odom	DE	Arkansas State
2	13	New Jersey Generals	Bryson Young	DE	Oregon
2	14	Philadelphia Stars	Freedom Akinmoladun	DE	Nebraska
2	15	Tampa Bay Bandits	Mekhi Brown	DE	Tennessee State
2	16	Michigan Panthers	Adewale Adeoye	DE	Utah State
3	17	Michigan Panthers	Cavon Walker	DE	Maryland
3	18	Tampa Bay Bandits	Michael Scott	DE	Oklahoma State
3	19	Philadelphia Stars	Gus Cumberlander	DE	Oregon
3	20	New Jersey Generals	Kolin Hill	DE	Texas Tech
3	21	Houston Gamblers	Ahmad Gooden	DE	Samford
3	22	Birmingham Stallions	Chauncy Haney	DE	North Greenville
3	23	Pittsburgh Maulers	Nasir Player	DE	East Tennessee State
3	24	New Orleans Breakers	Anree Saint-Amour	DE	Georgia Tech
4	25	New Orleans Breakers	James Folston Jr.	DE	Pittsburgh
4	26	Pittsburgh Maulers	Eric Assoua	DE	Western Michigan
4	27	Birmingham Stallions	Seth Thomas	DE	Northern Iowa
4	28	Houston Gamblers	Drequan Brown	DE	Central Oklahoma
4	29	New Jersey Generals	Malik Hamner	DE	Jackson State
4	30	Philadelphia Stars	Carroll Phillips	DE	Illinois
4	31	Tampa Bay Bandits	Adam Shuler	DE	Florida
4	32	Michigan Panthers	Chase DeMoor	DE	Central Washington
4	33	New Orleans Breakers (Note: Compensatory Pick)	Nigel Chavis	DE	Norfolk State
4	34	Birmingham Stallions (Note: Compensatory Pick)	Jonathan Newsome	DE	Ball State

==== Round 5–7: offensive tackles ====
Round	Pick #	USFL team	Player	Position	College
5	35	Pittsburgh Maulers	Chidi Okeke	OT	Tennessee State
5	36	Birmingham Stallions	Darius Harper	OT	Cincinnati
5	37	Houston Gamblers	Brandon Hitner	OT	Villanova
5	38	New Orleans Breakers	Paul Adams	OT	Missouri
5	39	Michigan Panthers	Keith Williams	OT	Colorado State
5	40	New Jersey Generals	Garrett McGhin	OT	East Carolina
5	41	Philadelphia Stars	Blake Camper	OT	South Carolina
5	42	Tampa Bay Bandits	Tyler Catalina	OT	Georgia
6	43	Tampa Bay Bandits	Corbin Kaufusi	OT	BYU
6	44	Philadelphia Stars	Michael Rodriguez III	OT	Louisiana Tech
6	45	New Jersey Generals	Calvin Ashley	OT	Auburn
6	46	Michigan Panthers	Teton Saltes	OT	New Mexico
6	47	New Orleans Breakers	Donnell Greene	OT	Minnesota
6	48	Houston Gamblers	Avery Gennesy	OT	Texas A&M
6	49	Birmingham Stallions	O'Shea Dugas	OT	Louisiana Tech
6	50	Pittsburgh Maulers	Isaiah Battle	OT	Clemson
7	51	Pittsburgh Maulers	Charles Baldwin	OT	Youngstown State
7	52	Birmingham Stallions	Justice Powers	OT	UAB
7	53	Houston Gamblers	John Yarbrough	OT	Richmond
7	54	New Orleans Breakers	Marquis Lucas	OT	West Virginia
7	55	Michigan Panthers	Josh Dunlop	OT	UTSA
7	56	New Jersey Generals	Terry Poole	OT	San Diego State
7	57	Philadelphia Stars	Jake Burton	OT	Baylor
7	58	Tampa Bay Bandits	Juwann Bushell-Beatty	OT	Michigan
7	59	Birmingham Stallions (Note: Compensatory Pick)	Matthew Snow	OT	Pace
7	60	Michigan Panthers (Note: Compensatory Pick)	Joshua Taylor	OT	Mississippi Valley State

==== Round 8–11: cornerbacks ====
Round	Pick #	USFL team	Player	Position	College
8	61	Tampa Bay Bandits	Delrick Abrams	CB	Colorado
8	62	Philadelphia Stars	Channing Stribling	CB	Michigan
8	63	New Jersey Generals	De'Vante Bausby	CB	Pittsburg State
8	64	Michigan Panthers	Tino Ellis	CB	Maryland
8	65	New Orleans Breakers	Adonis Alexander	CB	Virginia Tech
8	66	Houston Gamblers	Jamar Summers	CB	Connecticut
8	67	Birmingham Stallions	Brian Allen	CB	Utah
8	68	Pittsburgh Maulers	Ajene Harris	CB	USC
9	69	Pittsburgh Maulers	Terrell Bonds	CB	Tennessee State
9	70	Birmingham Stallions	Tae Hayes	CB	Appalachian State
9	71	Houston Gamblers	William Likely	CB	Maryland
9	72	New Orleans Breakers	~~Derrick Jones~~ (Note: New Orleans' selection of CB Derrick Jones was invalidated after Jones was revealed to still be under contract to the Calgary Stampeders of the Canadian Football League.)	~~CB~~	~~Ole Miss~~
9	73	Michigan Panthers	Jameson Houston	CB	Baylor
9	74	New Jersey Generals	Trae Elston	CB	Ole Miss
9	75	Philadelphia Stars	Marcus Lewis	CB	Maryland
9	76	Tampa Bay Bandits	Devante Davis	CB	Texas
10	77	Tampa Bay Bandits	Christian Campbell	CB	Penn State
10	78	Philadelphia Stars	Mazzi Wilkins	CB	South Florida
10	79	New Jersey Generals	David Rivers	CB	Youngstown State
10	80	Michigan Panthers	Dominique Martin	CB	Tarleton State
10	81	New Orleans Breakers	Manny Patterson	CB	Maine
10	82	Houston Gamblers	Howard Wilson	CB	Houston
10	83	Birmingham Stallions	Bryan Mills	CB	North Carolina Central
10	84	Pittsburgh Maulers	Prince Robinson	CB	Tarleton State
11	85	Pittsburgh Maulers	Jaylon McClain-Sapp	CB	Marshall
11	86	Birmingham Stallions	Lorenzo Burns	CB	Arizona
11	87	Houston Gamblers	Jerry Cantave	CB	William Jewell
11	88	New Orleans Breakers	Ja'Len Embry	CB	Northern Illinois
11	89	Michigan Panthers	Jalin Burrell	CB	New Mexico
11	90	New Jersey Generals	DeJuan Neal	CB	Shepherd
11	91	Philadelphia Stars	Bradley Sylve	CB	Alabama
11	92	Tampa Bay Bandits	Rashard Causey Jr.	CB	UCF
11	93	New Orleans Breakers (Note: Compensatory Pick)	Ike Brown	CB	FIU

==== Round 12: quarterbacks ====
Round	Pick #	USFL team	Player	Position	College
12	94	New Orleans Breakers	Zach Smith	QB	Tulsa
12	95	Pittsburgh Maulers	Josh Love	QB	San Jose State
12	96	Birmingham Stallions	J'Mar Smith	QB	Louisiana Tech
12	97	Houston Gamblers	Kenji Bahar	QB	Monmouth (NJ)
12	98	New Jersey Generals	De'Andre Johnson	QB	Texas Southern
12	99	Philadelphia Stars	Case Cookus	QB	Northern Arizona
12	100	Tampa Bay Bandits	Brady White	QB	Memphis
12	101	Michigan Panthers	Paxton Lynch	QB	Memphis

=== Day 2 ===
==== Round 13–17: wide receivers ====
Round	Pick #	USFL team	Player	Position	College
13	102	Birmingham Stallions	Victor Bolden Jr.	WR	Oregon State
13	103	Houston Gamblers	Isaiah Zuber	WR	Mississippi State
13	104	New Orleans Breakers	Shawn Poindexter	WR	Arizona
13	105	Pittsburgh Maulers	Jeff Thomas	WR	Miami (FL)
13	106	Tampa Bay Bandits	Eli Rogers	WR	Louisville
13	107	Michigan Panthers	Quincy Adeboyejo	WR	Ole Miss
13	108	New Jersey Generals	KaVontae Turpin	WR	TCU
13	109	Philadelphia Stars	Devin Gray	WR	Cincinnati
14	110	Philadelphia Stars	Jordan Suell	WR	Southern Oregon
14	111	New Jersey Generals	J'Mon Moore	WR	Missouri
14	112	Michigan Panthers	Lance Lenoir	WR	Western Illinois
14	113	Tampa Bay Bandits	Derrick Willies	WR	Texas Tech
14	114	Pittsburgh Maulers	Bailey Gaither	WR	San Jose State
14	115	New Orleans Breakers	Johnnie Dixon	WR	Ohio State
14	116	Houston Gamblers	JoJo Ward	WR	Hawai'i
14	117	Birmingham Stallions	Emanuel Hall	WR	Missouri
15	118	Birmingham Stallions	Osirus Mitchell	WR	Mississippi State
15	119	Houston Gamblers	Anthony Ratliff-Williams	WR	North Carolina
15	120	New Orleans Breakers	Jonathan Adams Jr.	WR	Arkansas State
15	121	Pittsburgh Maulers	Branden Mack	WR	Temple
15	122	Tampa Bay Bandits	Derrick Dillon	WR	LSU
15	123	Michigan Panthers	Jeff Badet	WR	Oklahoma
15	124	New Jersey Generals	Darrius Shepherd	WR	North Dakota State
15	125	Philadelphia Stars	Brennan Eagles	WR	Texas
16	126	Philadelphia Stars	Diondre Overton	WR	Clemson
16	127	New Jersey Generals	Christopher Platt Jr.	WR	Baylor
16	128	Michigan Panthers	Ray Bolden	WR	Stony Brook
16	129	Tampa Bay Bandits	Jordan Lasley	WR	UCLA
16	130	Pittsburgh Maulers	Delvon Hardaway	WR	Fresno State
16	131	New Orleans Breakers	Taywan Taylor	WR	Western Kentucky
16	132	Houston Gamblers	Tyler Simmons	WR	Georgia
16	133	Birmingham Stallions	Peyton Ramzy	WR	Tuskegee
17	134	Birmingham Stallions	Manasseh Bailey	WR	Morgan State
17	–	Houston Gamblers	Passed for compensatory pick		
17	135	New Orleans Breakers	Chad Williams	WR	Grambling State
17	136	Pittsburgh Maulers	Tre Walker	WR	San Jose State
17	137	Tampa Bay Bandits	John Franklin III	WR	Florida Atlantic
17	–	Michigan Panthers	Passed for compensatory pick		
17	138	New Jersey Generals	Randy Satterfield	WR	Lyon
17	139	Philadelphia Stars	Maurice Alexander	WR	FIU
17	140	Tampa Bay Bandits (Note: Compensatory Pick)	Vinny Papale	WR	Delaware

==== Rounds 18–19: safeties ====
Round	Pick #	USFL team	Player	Position	College
18	141	Philadelphia Stars	Jack Tocho	S	NC State
18	142	New Jersey Generals	Shalom Luani	S	Washington State
18	143	Michigan Panthers	Orion Stewart	S	Baylor
18	144	Tampa Bay Bandits	Obi Melifonwu	S	UConn
18	145	Pittsburgh Maulers	Arnold Tarpley III	S	Vanderbilt
18	146	New Orleans Breakers	Dartez Jacobs	S	Georgia State
18	147	Houston Gamblers	Andrew Soroh	S	Florida Atlantic
18	148	Birmingham Stallions	Christian McFarland	S	Idaho State
19	149	Birmingham Stallions	Tyree Robinson	S	Oregon
19	150	Houston Gamblers	Manny Bunch	S	Tulsa
19	–	New Orleans Breakers	Passed for compensatory pick		
19	151	Pittsburgh Maulers	Bryce Torneden	S	Kansas
19	152	Tampa Bay Bandits	Anthony Cioffi	S	Rutgers
19	153	Michigan Panthers	Kieron Williams	S	Nebraska
19	154	New Jersey Generals	Dravon Askew-Henry	S	West Virginia
19	155	Philadelphia Stars	Cody Brown	S	Arkansas State
19	156	Philadelphia Stars (Note: Compensatory Pick)	LaDarius Wiley	S	Vanderbilt

==== Round 20: centers ====
Round	Pick #	USFL team	Player	Position	College
20	157	New Jersey Generals	Jake Lacina	C	Augustana (SD)
20	158	Michigan Panthers	Sean Pollard	C	Clemson
20	159	Tampa Bay Bandits	Bruno Reagan	C	Vanderbilt
20	160	Philadelphia Stars	Sean Brown	C	Mississippi Valley State
20	161	Birmingham Stallions	Jordan McCray	C	UCF
20	162	Pittsburgh Maulers	Nico Falah	C	USC
20	163	New Orleans Breakers	Jared Thomas	C	Northwestern
20	164	Houston Gamblers	Nick Buchanan	C	Florida
20	165	Pittsburgh Maulers	Brayden Patton	C	Northern Illinois

==== Round 21: inside linebackers ====
Round	Pick #	USFL team	Player	Position	College
21	166	Houston Gamblers	Beniquez Brown	ILB	Mississippi State
21	167	New Orleans Breakers	Jerod Fernandez	ILB	NC State
21	168	Pittsburgh Maulers	E. J. Ejiya	ILB	North Texas
21	169	Birmingham Stallions	Scooby Wright	ILB	Arizona
21	170	Philadelphia Stars	Josh Banderas	ILB	Nebraska
21	171	Tampa Bay Bandits	Christian Sam	ILB	Arizona State
21	172	Michigan Panthers	Justin Hughes	ILB	Kansas State
21	173	New Jersey Generals	Chris Orr	ILB	Wisconsin
21	174	Houston Gamblers	Reggie Northrup	ILB	Florida State
21	175	Birmingham Stallions	Jason Ferris	ILB	Montana Western
21	176	Michigan Panthers	Taiwan Jones	ILB	Michigan State

==== Rounds 22–23: guards ====
Round	Pick #	USFL team	Player	Position	College
22	177	New Orleans Breakers	Steven Rowzee	G	Troy
22	178	Pittsburgh Maulers	Vadal Alexander	G	LSU
22	179	Birmingham Stallions	Cameron Hunt	G	Oregon
22	180	Houston Gamblers	Tyler Higby	G	Michigan State
22	181	New Jersey Generals	Mike Brown	G	West Virginia
22	182	Philadelphia Stars	Jackson Scott-Brown	G	Northern Iowa
22	183	Tampa Bay Bandits	Fred Lauina	G	Oregon State
22	184	Michigan Panthers	Marquel Harrell	G	Auburn
23	185	Michigan Panthers	Daishawn Dixon	G	San Diego State
23	186	Tampa Bay Bandits	Damien Mama	G	USC
23	187	Philadelphia Stars	Paul Nosworthy	G	Buffalo
23	188	New Jersey Generals	Evan Heim	G	Minnesota State
23	189	Houston Gamblers	Terronne Prescod	G	NC State
23	–	Birmingham Stallions	Passed for compensatory pick		
23	190	Pittsburgh Maulers	Jon Dietzen	G	Wisconsin
23	191	New Orleans Breakers	Liam Dobson	G	Texas State
23	192	New Orleans Breakers	Jalen Allen	G	Charlotte

==== Rounds 24–26: defensive tackles ====
Round	Pick #	USFL team	Player	Position	College
24	193	Michigan Panthers	TJ Carter	DT	Kentucky
24	194	Tampa Bay Bandits	Daylon Mack	DT	Texas A&M
24	195	Philadelphia Stars	Mike Barnett	DT	Georgia
24	196	New Jersey Generals	Destiny Vaeao	DT	Washington State
24	197	Houston Gamblers	Cory Thomas	DT	Mississippi State
24	198	Birmingham Stallions	Willie Yarbary	DT	Wake Forest
24	199	Pittsburgh Maulers	Olive Sagapolu	DT	Wisconsin
24	200	New Orleans Breakers	Shakir Soto	DT	Pittsburgh
25	201	New Orleans Breakers	Kamilo Tongamoa	DT	Iowa State
25	202	Pittsburgh Maulers	Boogie Roberts	DT	San Jose State
25	203	Birmingham Stallions	Haston Adams	DT	Mary Hardin–Baylor
25	204	Houston Gamblers	Tomasi Laulile	DT	BYU
25	205	New Jersey Generals	Toby Johnson	DT	Georgia
25	206	Philadelphia Stars	Chris Nelson	DT	Texas
25	207	Tampa Bay Bandits	Reggie Howard	DT	Toledo
25	208	Michigan Panthers	JaQuan Bailey	DT	Iowa State
26	209	Michigan Panthers	Kyshonn Tyson	DT	Grand Valley State
26	210	Tampa Bay Bandits	John Atkins	DT	Georgia
26	211	Philadelphia Stars	Jerome Johnson	DT	Indiana
26	212	New Jersey Generals	Kalani Vakameilalo	DT	Oregon State
26	213	Houston Gamblers	Domenique Davis	DT	UNC Pembroke
26	–	Birmingham Stallions	Passed for compensatory pick		
26	214	Pittsburgh Maulers	Jeremiah Pharms	DT	Friends
26	215	New Orleans Breakers	Connor Christian	DT	Jacksonville State
26	216	New Orleans Breakers	Chris Okoye	DT	Ferris State

==== Rounds 27–28: running backs ====
Round	Pick #	USFL team	Player	Position	College
27	217	Tampa Bay Bandits	B. J. Emmons	RB	Florida Atlantic
27	218	Philadelphia Stars	Darnell Holland	RB	Kennesaw State
27	219	New Jersey Generals	Mike Weber	RB	Ohio State
27	220	Michigan Panthers	Stevie Scott III	RB	Indiana
27	221	New Orleans Breakers	Larry Rose III	RB	New Mexico State
27	222	Houston Gamblers	Dalyn Dawkins	RB	Colorado State
27	223	Birmingham Stallions	Tony Brooks-James	RB	Oregon
27	224	Pittsburgh Maulers	Garrett Groshek	RB	Wisconsin
28	225	Pittsburgh Maulers	De'Veon Smith	RB	Michigan
28	226	Birmingham Stallions	C. J. Marable	RB	Coastal Carolina
28	227	Houston Gamblers	Mark Thompson	RB	Florida
28	228	New Orleans Breakers	Jordan Ellis	RB	Virginia
28	229	Michigan Panthers	Reggie Corbin	RB	Illinois
28	230	New Jersey Generals	Trey Williams	RB	Texas A&M
28	231	Philadelphia Stars	Matt Colburn	RB	Wake Forest
28	232	Tampa Bay Bandits	Juwan Washington	RB	San Diego State

==== Rounds 29–31: outside linebackers ====
Round	Pick #	USFL team	Player	Position	College
29	233	Pittsburgh Maulers	Tyson Graham	OLB	South Dakota
29	234	Birmingham Stallions	DeMarquis Gates	OLB	Ole Miss
29	235	Houston Gamblers	Azeem Victor	OLB	Washington
29	236	New Orleans Breakers	Diondre Wallace	OLB	Towson
29	237	Michigan Panthers	Terry Myrick	OLB	Eastern Michigan
29	238	New Jersey Generals	D'Juan Hines	OLB	Houston
29	239	Philadelphia Stars	Jordan Moore	OLB	UTSA
29	240	Tampa Bay Bandits	Emmanuel Beal	OLB	Oklahoma
30	241	Tampa Bay Bandits	Greg Reaves	OLB	South Florida
30	242	Philadelphia Stars	Te'von Coney	OLB	Notre Dame
30	243	New Jersey Generals	Tim Walton Jr	OLB	Texas Southern
30	244	Michigan Panthers	Frank Ginda	OLB	San Jose State
30	245	New Orleans Breakers	Vontae Diggs	OLB	UConn
30	246	Houston Gamblers	Donald Payne	OLB	Stetson
30	247	Birmingham Stallions	Terrill Hanks	OLB	New Mexico State
30	248	Pittsburgh Maulers	Malcolm Howard	OLB	Central Oklahoma
31	249	Pittsburgh Maulers	Kyahva Tezino	OLB	San Diego State
31	250	Birmingham Stallions	Brody Buck	OLB	Northwest Missouri State
31	251	Houston Gamblers	Drew Lewis	OLB	Colorado
31	–	New Orleans Breakers	Passed for compensatory pick		
31	252	Michigan Panthers	Tre Threat	OLB	Jacksonville State
31	253	New Jersey Generals	Angelo Garbutt	OLB	Iowa
31	254	Philadelphia Stars	Solomon Wise	OLB	Alcorn State
31	–	Tampa Bay Bandits	Passed for compensatory pick		

==== Round 32: kickers ====
Round	Pick #	USFL team	Player	Position	College
32	255	Philadelphia Stars	Matt Mengel	K	UCLA
32	256	New Jersey Generals	Nick Rose	K	Texas
32	–	Michigan Panthers	Passed for compensatory pick		
32	257	Tampa Bay Bandits	Brandon Wright	K	Georgia State
32	–	Pittsburgh Maulers	Passed for compensatory pick		
32	258	New Orleans Breakers	Austin MacGinnis	K	Kentucky
32	259	Houston Gamblers	Nick Vogel	K	UAB
32	260	Birmingham Stallions	Brandon Aubrey	K	Notre Dame

==== Round 33: punters ====
Round	Pick #	USFL team	Player	Position	College
33	261	Birmingham Stallions	Colby Wadman	P	UC Davis
33	262	Houston Gamblers	Andrew Galitz	P	Baylor
33	–	New Orleans Breakers	Passed for compensatory pick		
33	–	Pittsburgh Maulers	Passed for compensatory pick		
33	–	Tampa Bay Bandits	Passed for compensatory pick		
33	263	Michigan Panthers	Michael Carrizosa	P	San Jose State
33	–	New Jersey Generals	Passed for compensatory pick		
33	–	Philadelphia Stars	Passed for compensatory pick		

==== Round 34: tight ends ====
Round	Pick #	USFL team	Player	Position	College
34	264	Houston Gamblers	Brandon Barnes	TE	Alabama State
34	265	New Orleans Breakers	Sal Cannella	TE	Auburn
34	266	Pittsburgh Maulers	Matt Seybert	TE	Michigan State
34	267	Birmingham Stallions	Cary Angeline	TE	NC State
34	268	Philadelphia Stars	Bug Howard	TE	North Carolina
34	269	Tampa Bay Bandits	Cheyenne O'Grady	TE	Arkansas
34	270	Michigan Panthers	Joseph Magnifico	TE	Memphis
34	271	New Jersey Generals	Braedon Bowman	TE	South Alabama
34	272	Houston Gamblers	Julian Allen	TE	Southern Miss
34	273	Tampa Bay Bandits	De'Quan Hampton	TE	USC
34	274	Michigan Panthers	La'Michael Pettway	TE	Iowa State
34	275	New Jersey Generals	Nick Truesdell	TE	Grand Rapids CC

==== Round 35: long snappers ====
Round	Pick #	USFL team	Player	Position	College
35	276	New Jersey Generals	Scott Flanick	LS	Army
35	–	Michigan Panthers	Passed for compensatory pick		
35	277	Tampa Bay Bandits	Ryan Disalvo	LS	San Jose State
35	278	Philadelphia Stars	Ryan Navarro	LS	Oregon State
35	–	Birmingham Stallions	Passed for compensatory pick		
35	279	Pittsburgh Maulers	Mitchell Fraboni	LS	Arizona State
35	–	New Orleans Breakers	Passed for compensatory pick		
35	–	Houston Gamblers	Passed for compensatory pick		

=== Supplemental draft ===
A supplemental draft was held on March 10, 2022, with an additional 80 players selected to fill three final roster spots and seven practice squad spots per team.

Round	Pick #	USFL team	Player	Position	College
S1	281	Breakers	Justin Johnson	TE	Mississippi
S1	282	Maulers	Ethan Westbrooks	DT	West Texas A&M
S1	283	Stallions	Ryan Williams-Pope	OT	San Diego State
S1	284	Gamblers	Josh Avery	DT	SE Missouri State
S1	285	Generals	Tyshun Render	DE	Middle Tennessee
S1	286	Stars	Gunnar Vogel	OT	Northwestern
S1	287	Bandits	Jarron Jones	OT	Notre Dame
S1	288	Panthers	Warren Saba	CB/S	East Carolina
S2	289	Panthers	Maea Teuhema	G	SE Louisiana
S2	290	Bandits	Quenton Meeks	CB/S	Stanford
S2	291	Stars	Adam Rodriguez	EDGE/FB	Weber State
S2	292	Generals	Christian Tutt	CB/RET	Auburn
S2	293	Gamblers	Kristjan Sokoli	G/C/DE	Buffalo
S2	294	Stallions	Jojo Tillery	S	Wofford
S2	295	Maulers	Keith Gibson Jr	CB	Mary Hardin-Baylor
S2	296	Breakers	Keith Washington II	CB	West Virginia
S3	297	Bandits	Matthew Burrell Jr	C/G/OT	Sam Houston State
S3	298	Stars	Lene Maiava	OT	Arizona
S3	299	Generals	Mike Bell	SS/LB	Fresno State
S3	300	Panthers	Marcus Baugh	TE	Ohio State
S3	301	Breakers	T. J. Logan	RB	North Carolina
S3	302	Gamblers	Malik Harris	DE	Incarnate Word
S3	303	Stallions	Dondrea Tillman	DE	IUP
S3	304	Maulers	Dale Warren	OLB	UT-Chattanooga
S4	305	Maulers	Winston Dimel	FB	Kansas State
S4	306	Stallions	Nate Holley	SS/OLB	Kent State
S4	307	Gamblers	Micah Abernathy	CB	Tennessee
S4	308	Breakers	Shareef Miller	DE	Penn State
S4	309	Panthers	Sean Williams	FS/OLB	Navy
S4	310	Generals	Paris Ford	S	Pittsburgh
S4	311	Stars	Amani Dennis	CB	Carthage
S4	312	Bandits	Keith Mumphery	WR	Michigan State
S5	313	Stars	Artayvious Lynn	TE	TCU
S5	314	Generals	Brock Miller	P	Southern Utah
S5	315	Panthers	Cameron Scarlett	RB	Stanford
S5	316	Bandits	Tyler Rausa	K	Boise State
S5	317	Maulers	Malcolm Elmore	S/CB	Central Methodist
S5	318	Breakers	Aashari Crosswell	S	Arizona State
S5	319	Gamblers	Devwah Whaley	RB	Arkansas
S5	320	Stallions	Jordan Chunn	RB	Troy
S6	321	Stallions	Sage Surratt	TE	Wake Forest
S6	322	Gamblers	Tucker Addington	LS	Sam Houston State
S6	323	Breakers	E. J. Bibbs	TE/FB	Iowa State
S6	324	Maulers	Abdul Beecham	G/C	Kansas State
S6	325	Bandits	Stephen Griffin	S/CB	NC State
S6	326	Panthers	Connor Davis	TE	Stony Brook
S6	327	Generals	Darius Victor	RB	Towson
S6	328	Stars	Chris Rowland	WR	Tennessee State
S7	329	Gamblers	Erick Browne	G	Merrimack
S7	330	Breakers	Turner Bernard	LS	San Diego State
S7	331	Maulers	Ramiz Ahmed	K	Nevada
S7	332	Stallions	Marlon Williams	WR	UCF
S7	333	Stars	Gabriel Sewell Jr	ILB	Nevada
S7	334	Bandits	Rannell Hall	CB	UCF
S7	335	Panthers	Joseph Putu	CB	Florida
S7	336	Generals	Robert Myers	G/OT	Tennessee State
S8	337	Generals	Jacob Williams	TE	Western Kentucky
S8	338	Panthers	Devin Ross	WR/RET	Colorado
S8	339	Bandits	Travis Feeney	OLB	Washington
S8	340	Stars	Ahmad Dixon	S/CB	Baylor
S8	341	Stallions	Josh Shaw	CB/S	USC
S8	342	Maulers	Hunter Thedford	TE	Utah
S8	343	Breakers	Jarey Elder	S	West Chester
S8	344	Gamblers	Teo Redding	WR	Bowling Green
S9	345	Stallions	Marquez Tucker	G	Southern Utah
S9	346	Gamblers	Tyler Palka	WR/QB	Gannon
S9	347	Panthers	Tejan Koroma	C/G	BYU
S9	348	Generals	Brandon Haskin	OT/G/C	Tennessee State
S9	349	Breakers	Matt White	P/K	Monmouth
S9	350	Stars	Jahair Jones	G	Miami
S9	351	Maulers	Max Duffy	P	Kentucky
S9	352	Bandits	Austrian Robinson	DE/DT	Ole Miss
S10	353	Bandits	Antonio Reed	SS/OLB	Nebraska
S10	354	Maulers	Darrius Moragne	DT/DE	Kansas
S10	355	Stars	Paul Terry	RB/WR/ST	Eastern New Mexico
S10	356	Breakers	Toree Boyd	C/G/OT	Howard
S10	357	Generals	Alonzo Moore	WR	Nebraska
S10	358	Panthers	Shane Griffin	LS	West Chester
S10	359	Gamblers	Stanley Green	CB	Illinois
S10	360	Stallions	Bobby Holly	FB/RB/TE	Louisiana Tech
