= Justice Powers (American football) =

American football player (born 1996)

Profile
- Position: Offensive tackle

Personal information
- Born: April 7, 1996 (age 30); Cedar Hill, Texas, U.S.
- Listed height: 6 ft 3 in (1.91 m)
- Listed weight: 295 lb (134 kg)

Career information
- High school: Cedar Hill (Cedar Hill, Texas)
- College: UAB
- NFL draft: 2019: undrafted

Career history
- Los Angeles Rams (2019)*; Hamilton Tiger-Cats (2019–2020); Birmingham Stallions (2022); Ottawa Redblacks (2022)*
- * Offseason or practice squad member only

Justice Powers (born April 7, 1996) is an American former professional football offensive tackle. He played college football at UAB. He was a member of the Los Angeles Rams of the National Football League (NFL), the Hamilton Tiger-Cats and Ottawa Redblacks of the Canadian Football League (CFL), and the Birmingham Stallions of the United States Football League (USFL).

== College career ==
After graduating high school, he attended Trinity Valley Community College in Athens, Texas. He appeared in 12 games where he helped his team win the 2016 SWJCFC Championship. He was also named 2016 JUCO Super Sophomore Selectee by Sporting News College Football Preview Magazine. The following year he played for UAB and played 27 games. In 2018 he was a UAB representative along with Spencer Brown on First-team All-Conference USA.

== Professional career ==
=== Los Angeles Rams ===
After going undrafted in 2019 he was signed by the Los Angeles Rams on April 30, 2019. On May 21, 2019, he was waived.

=== Hamilton Tiger-Cats ===
On December 23, 2019, he was signed to the Hamilton Tiger-Cats. On July 29, 2021, he was released.

=== Birmingham Stallions ===
Powers was selected in the 7th round of the 2022 USFL draft by the Birmingham Stallions. He was transferred to the team's inactive roster on April 30, 2022. He was moved back to the active roster on May 6. He was released on May 10.

=== Ottawa Redblacks ===
Powers signed with the Ottawa Redblacks of the CFL on May 11, 2022. However, he was released after the first 2022 pre-season game on May 29, 2022. The Redblacks signed Powers to the practice roster on September 20, 2022, approximately two-thirds of the way through the 2022 regular season. On June 3, 2023, Powers was released by the Redblacks.
