= Todd Haley =

American football coach (born 1967)

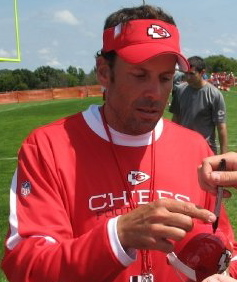
- Haley with the Kansas City Chiefs in 2009

Columbus Aviators
- Title: Offensive coordinator

Personal information
- Born: February 28, 1967 (age 59); Atlanta, Georgia U.S.

Career information
- High school: Upper St. Clair (Upper St. Clair Township, Pennsylvania)
- College: North Florida

Career history

Coaching
- New York Jets (1995–1996) Scouting assistant; New York Jets (1997–2000) Wide receivers coach; Chicago Bears (2001–2003) Wide receivers coach; Dallas Cowboys (2004–2006) Wide receivers coach; Arizona Cardinals (2007–2008) Offensive coordinator; Kansas City Chiefs (2009–2011) Head coach; Pittsburgh Steelers (2012–2017) Offensive coordinator; Cleveland Browns (2018) Offensive coordinator; Riverview HS (FL) (2020–2021) Offensive coordinator; Tampa Bay Bandits (2022) Head coach; Memphis Showboats (2023) Head coach; Columbus Aviators (2026–present) Offensive coordinator

Operations
- Tampa Bay Bandits (2022) General manager

Head coaching record
- Regular season: 28–38 (.424)
- Postseason: 0–1 (.000)
- Career: 28–39 (.418)
- Coaching profile at Pro Football Reference

Richard Todd Haley (born February 28, 1967) is an American football coach who is currently the offensive coordinator for the Columbus Aviators of the United Football League (UFL).

From 1997 to 2006, he had stints as the wide receivers coach of the New York Jets, Chicago Bears, and Dallas Cowboys. He served as the offensive coordinator of the Arizona Cardinals from 2007 to 2008, the head coach of the Kansas City Chiefs from 2009 to 2011, the offensive coordinator of the Pittsburgh Steelers from 2012 to 2017, and the offensive coordinator of the Cleveland Browns in 2018 (he was fired in Week 8 of his first season with the team). Haley also coached the Tampa Bay Bandits in 2022.

== Early life and college ==
Haley was born on February 28, 1967, in Atlanta, Georgia. He is the son of Dick Haley, the former director of player personnel for the Pittsburgh Steelers and New York Jets and a former NFL cornerback. As a youth, Haley was a ball boy for the Steelers and attended Steelers training camps with his father. Alongside his father, Haley would watch the Steelers' game and practice film.

Haley attended Upper St. Clair High School, and went on to attend the University of Florida and then the University of Miami, where he played on the two schools' respective golf squads. In 1991, Haley graduated from the University of North Florida with a bachelor's degree in communication. Haley is one of the few coaches to have never played football beyond youth level.

== Coaching career ==
=== New York Jets ===
Haley was hired by the New York Jets in 1995 and served as an assistant in the scouting department for two seasons. At the time, Haley's father Dick was working with the Jets as director of player personnel. In 1997, he was promoted to offensive assistant/quality control coach and worked closely Charlie Weis, who was then offensive coordinator for the Jets.

From 1999 to 2000, Haley was the Jets' wide receivers coach, where he coached Keyshawn Johnson to his second Pro Bowl appearance. During his tenure with the Jets, Haley began his association with Scott Pioli, who served as director of pro Personnel for the Jets from 1997 to 1999. Pioli later became the general manager of the Kansas City Chiefs and hired Haley as the team's head coach in 2009.

=== Chicago Bears ===
In 2001, Haley joined the Chicago Bears as wide receivers coach, and served in the position until 2003.

=== Dallas Cowboys ===
From 2004 to 2006, Haley was the wide receivers coach and passing game coordinator for the Dallas Cowboys, where he helped develop quarterback Tony Romo and the Cowboys' passing offense, which centered around wide receivers Terry Glenn and Terrell Owens.

=== Arizona Cardinals ===
In 2007, Haley joined Ken Whisenhunt's coaching staff for the Arizona Cardinals as the team's offensive coordinator. Haley did not start calling plays for the Cardinals until late in the season. The Cardinals finished in the top half of the NFL in multiple offensive categories.

Under Haley's guidance, the Cardinals offense in 2008 was one of the league's most innovative and explosive units. Arizona tied for third in the league in scoring, registering a franchise-record 427 points (26.7 ppg). The Cardinals were fourth in total offense, averaging 365.8 yards per game. Arizona was second in the league in passing offense (292.1 ypg) and ranked sixth in the NFL with 20.5 first downs per game. The Cardinals finished the season with a 9–7 record and a playoff berth after winning the NFC West Division title. The Cardinals went on to appear in their first Super Bowl in franchise history after the team scored more than 30 points in each of its three playoff games.

In Super Bowl XLIII, the Cardinals offense played the NFL's top-ranked Pittsburgh Steelers defense. Trailing 17–7 at halftime, the Cardinals offense fought back after a 13-point deficit and led the game 23–20 with just over two minutes remaining. The Cardinals lost 27–23 in the game's final seconds.

=== Kansas City Chiefs ===
On December 14, 2008, a last-minute loss to the San Diego Chargers led longtime Kansas City Chiefs general manager Carl Peterson to abruptly announce his resignation the following day, paving the way for the hiring of Scott Pioli on January 13, 2009 as Peterson's successor. The decision to hire Pioli led to speculation that Herman Edwards, who had been serving as the Chiefs' head coach since 2006, was not likely to return for 2009. Edwards was fired on January 23, just five days after the Arizona Cardinals defeated the Philadelphia Eagles in the NFC Championship Game. Leading up to Super Bowl XLIII, Haley was repeatedly questioned about Kansas City and the possibilities of joining his former colleague Pioli. Haley would later say that it was the day after the Super Bowl, which the Cardinals lost, that he heard his name mentioned for the Chiefs' coaching position.

In the days after the Cardinals' appearance in Super Bowl XLIII, Haley was offered the head coaching position of the Chiefs. Haley accepted the position on February 6, 2009, and signed a four-year contract. For his first coaching staff, Haley hired Joel Collier, Gary Gibbs, Steve Hoffman, Bill Muir, Clancy Pendergast, Pat Perles, and Dedric Ward to unspecified positions on the Chiefs' 2009 coaching staff and retained Bob Bicknell, Joe D'Alessandris, Chan Gailey, Tim Krumrie, Brent Salazar, and Cedric Smith from Herm Edwards' staff. Ward and Pendergast had previously served on the Cardinals' coaching staff with Haley.

Initially there were doubts as to whether Chan Gailey would be retained under Haley's coaching staff, because Haley had just concluded a successful stint as offensive coordinator at Arizona. Haley initially expressed satisfaction in working with Gailey. After the Chiefs lost their first three preseason games partially due to an abysmal offensive performance, however, Haley reportedly refused to bow to Gailey's suggestion to once again install a spread offense similar to the one installed midway through the 2008 season. Gailey was relieved of duties and Haley assumed offensive play-calling duties throughout the rest of the season.

The Chiefs lost their first five games under Haley in 2009. Haley won his first game as the Chiefs' head coach on October 18, 2009, beating the Washington Redskins 14–6.

In late October 2009 the Chiefs suspended starting running back Larry Johnson for one week in response to his public comments on Twitter where he questioned Haley's coaching abilities and for using homophobic slurs when he addressed the media. Johnson's Twitter comments were: "My father got more creditentials than most of these pro coaches" [Sic]. That was followed by: "My father played for the coach from "Remember the Titans". Our coach played golf. My father played for the Redskins briefly. Our coach. Nuthin." [Sic] When Johnson returned from his suspension, he was released.

After Haley released Johnson, he led the Chiefs to their first two-game winning streak since the 2007 season with victories against the Oakland Raiders and Pittsburgh Steelers on November 15 and 22. The 27–24 victory over the Steelers—the defending Super Bowl champions—came in overtime. The Chiefs ended their season with a victory against the Denver Broncos who were looking to clinch a Wild-Card playoff berth with a win. This was the first Kansas City win at Denver since 2000 and their first victory at Invesco Field at Mile High, which opened in 2001. This concluded the Chiefs season with a 4–12 record, a two-win improvement from 2008.

In Haley's second season, the Chiefs won their first three games, including the season opener on Monday Night Football against the San Diego Chargers, and were the last undefeated team remaining in the NFL before losing at Indianapolis in Week 5. Kansas City went on to win the AFC West for the first time since 2003.

On January 9, 2011, the Chiefs played the Baltimore Ravens at Arrowhead Stadium. The Chiefs lost the game 30–7 with Matt Cassel passing for 70 yards and 3 interceptions. The only touchdown was a 41-yard touchdown run by Jamaal Charles.

On September 2, 2011, Haley elected to play his starters against the Green Bay Packers in the final preseason game of the year. Tight end Tony Moeaki, a crucial piece of the team's 2011 offensive plans, injured his knee at the beginning of the second quarter and was ruled out for the remainder of the season. In a game played mostly by the Chiefs starters and the Packers' backups, the Chiefs lost, 20–19, leading many to question Haley's decision to use his best players late into the game.

Despite having lost several key players to injuries, on October 31, 2011, Haley led the Chiefs to a come-from-behind victory on Monday Night Football. The win was KC's fourth in a row, which moved them into first place in the AFC West. It marked the first time in NFL history that a team that started 0–3 was leading its division by the halfway point of the season.

Chiefs starting quarterback Matt Cassel broke his hand during a week 11 game versus the Denver Broncos. He was replaced by Tyler Palko, and had surgery on the injured hand on November 14. On November 21, Cassel was placed on injured reserve, ending his season. Palko proved to be inadequate as a backup to a merely serviceable Cassel, leading many to question how a team with legitimate playoff hopes entering the 2011 season had remained so thin at so many key positions during the off-season, especially at quarterback and safety, where the Chiefs' lack of depth was more than woeful.

Haley was fired on December 12, 2011, after leading his team to a 5–8 record during the 2011 NFL season. The 2011 season began with three losses, including two blow-outs to Detroit and Buffalo. The team appeared to regroup, winning four straight games, before losing the next 5 of 6, including a complete team collapse in Haley's final game against the New York Jets. Late in that game Haley was flagged for an unsportsmanlike conduct penalty, allowing the Jets to complete a touchdown drive that ultimately put the game out of reach. On that drive, the Jets offense gained only 9 net yards, however still scored after starting at their own 10 yard line due to 81 yards across 5 penalties against the Chiefs (including the one against Haley). After the loss, defensive coordinator Romeo Crennel was promoted to replace Haley.

=== Pittsburgh Steelers ===
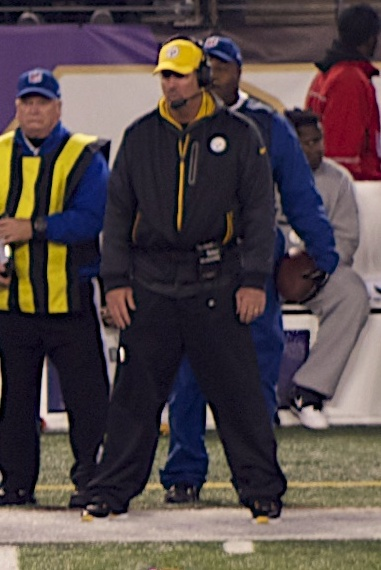
Haley during a game in 2013

On February 13, 2012, the Pittsburgh Steelers announced the hiring of Haley as the team's new offensive coordinator. Haley grew up in the Pittsburgh suburb of Upper St. Clair Township, Pennsylvania, and his father was the Steelers' former personnel director. He was the first offensive coordinator in 13 years to be hired from outside the organization.

Despite falling 23–16 to the eventual Super Bowl 50 champion Denver Broncos in the 2015–16 Divisional Round, of the Broncos' three postseason opponents en route to their Super Bowl title, Pittsburgh's offense found the most success against Denver's top-ranked "No Fly Zone" defense as Ben Roethlisberger was the only quarterback to not throw an interception, while Tom Brady threw two interceptions in the AFC Championship Game and Cam Newton threw one pick in Super Bowl 50. Pittsburgh committed just one turnover against the Broncos, compared to the New England Patriots committing two in the AFC Title Game and the Carolina Panthers turning it over four times in the Super Bowl. The Steelers also gained the most amount of total yards on offense with 396, with New England and Carolina recording 336 and 315 yards respectively, and also the greatest number of passing yards with 311, compared to the Patriots managing 229 yards through the air and the Panthers with 197 passing yards.

On January 17, 2018, the Steelers announced that Haley's contract, which had expired at the conclusion of the 2017 season, would not be renewed.

=== Cleveland Browns ===
On January 22, 2018, Haley was hired by the Cleveland Browns as their offensive coordinator. On October 29, 2018, Haley was fired along with head coach Hue Jackson.

=== Riverview High School ===
On February 14, 2020, Haley was hired as the offensive coordinator for the Riverview Rams in Sarasota, Florida.

=== Tampa Bay Bandits ===
On January 6, 2022, Haley was named Head coach and General manager for the Tampa Bay Bandits of the United States Football League.

=== Memphis Showboats ===
On November 15, 2022, it was announced that Haley would be the head coach of the Memphis Showboats for the 2023 USFL season. Haley was fired from this position on October 23, 2023.

=== Columbus Aviators ===
Haley currently serves as offensive coordinator for the Columbus Aviators of the United Football League. On April 11, 2026, Haley was named interim head coach for the Week 3 game against the Dallas Renegades after the team's head coach, Ted Ginn Jr., was arrested for driving under the influence. Ginn Jr. would later be reinstated as head coach on April 14, 2026.

=== Coaching style ===
Haley has been described as an aggressive coach and can be combative with players.

During the 2008 NFC championship game against the Philadelphia Eagles, he had a first-half argument with quarterback Kurt Warner in full view of television cameras and with wide receiver Anquan Boldin later in the game. As wide receivers coach with the Dallas Cowboys, he also had a spat with Terrell Owens, who was then a wide receiver with the Cowboys. Defending his style, Haley said "It's part of how I coach...It's part of how I motivate, and I like to think I've had some success doing it."

== Personal life ==
Haley has five children with his ex-wife Chrissy. They divorced in 2023.

In 2006, Haley filed a $1.5 million lawsuit against McDonald's after his wife found a dead rat in her salad. The salad was purchased at a Southlake, Texas, McDonald's restaurant while Haley was a member of the Dallas Cowboys coaching staff at the time. His wife and their live-in babysitter began to eat before noticing the rat. The case was settled out of court for an undisclosed sum.

On December 31, 2017, Haley, who was then offensive coordinator for the Pittsburgh Steelers, was injured following the Steelers' Week 17 game, according to a team spokesman. He was pushed down by an unknown assailant, which broke his pelvis. No charges were filed because no witnesses came forward to cooperate in criminal or civil prosecution.

== Head coaching record ==
=== NFL ===
Team	Year	Regular season					Postseason			
Team	Year	Won	Lost	Ties	Win %	Finish	Won	Lost	Win %	Result
KC	2009	4	12	0	.250	4th in AFC West	-	-	-	-
KC	2010	10	6	0	.625	1st in AFC West	0	1	.000	Lost to Baltimore Ravens in AFC wild card game
KC	2011	5	8	0	.385	Fired	-	-	-	-
Total		19	26	0			0	1	.000	

=== USFL/UFL ===
League	Team	Year	Regular season					Postseason			
League	Team	Year	Won	Lost	Ties	Win %	Finish	Won	Lost	Win %	Result
USFL	TB	2022	4	6	0	.400	3rd (South Division)	—	—	—	—
USFL	MEM	2023	5	5	0	.500	4th (South Division)	—	—	—	—
UFL	CLB*	2026	0	1	0	.000	—	—	—	—	—
Total			9	12	0	.429	—	—	—	—	—

*Interim head coach for Week 3 game against the Dallas Renegades.

== Coaching tree ==
Haley has served under six head coaches:

- Bill Parcells, New York Jets (1997–1999) & Dallas Cowboys (2004–2006)
- Al Groh, New York Jets (2000)
- Dick Jauron, Chicago Bears (2001–2003)
- Ken Whisenhunt, Arizona Cardinals (2007–2008)
- Mike Tomlin, Pittsburgh Steelers (2012–2017)
- Hue Jackson, Cleveland Browns (2018)

Four of Haley's coaching assistants have become head coaches in the NFL, XFL or NCAA:

- Romeo Crennel, Kansas City Chiefs (2011, interim; 2012)
- Charlie Weis, Kansas (2012–2014)
- Jim Zorn, Seattle Dragons (2020)
- Nick Sirianni, Philadelphia Eagles (2021–present)
