= Brennan Eagles =

American football player (born 1998)

No. 13, 83
- Position: Wide receiver

Personal information
- Born: October 24, 1998 (age 28); Baton Rouge, Louisiana, U.S.
- Listed height: 6 ft 4 in (1.93 m)
- Listed weight: 229 lb (104 kg)

Career information
- High school: Alief Taylor (TX)
- College: Texas (2018–2020)
- NFL draft: 2021: undrafted

Career history
- Dallas Cowboys (2021)*; Philadelphia Stars (2022); Hamilton Tiger-Cats (2023)*
- * Offseason or practice squad member only

Career USFL statistics
- Games played: 5
- Stats at Pro Football Reference

Brennan Eagles (born October 24, 1998) is an American former football wide receiver. He played college football for the Texas Longhorns and has been a member of the Dallas Cowboys, Philadelphia Stars and Hamilton Tiger-Cats.

== Early life and college ==
Eagles was born in Baton Rouge, Louisiana, and grew up in Houston, Texas. He attended Alief Taylor High School, and was a five-star recruit to college. He committed to the University of Texas at Austin, where he played in eleven games as a freshman, making one catch for 35 yards. As a sophomore, Eagles started seven times and appeared in twelve games, recording 32 receptions for 522 yards and scoring six touchdowns. In his junior year, he appeared in all nine games and started seven, leading the team with 28 catches for 469 yards and five touchdowns. He chose to forgo his senior season and declare for the National Football League Draft.

On Jun 5, 2020 Eagles announced he would not play another snap until racial injustice was ended.

Eagles finished his career with 32 games played, 15 starts, and 61 catches for 1,026 receiving yards and 11 touchdown catches.

== Professional career ==
Pre-draft measurables
Height	Weight	Arm length	Hand span	40-yard dash	10-yard split	20-yard split	20-yard shuttle	Three-cone drill	Vertical jump	Broad jump
6 ft 3 5/8 in (1.92 m)	225 lb (102 kg)	33 1/2 in (0.85 m)	10 in (0.25 m)	4.55 s	1.59 s	2.55 s	4.42 s	6.93 s	36.5 in (0.93 m)	10 ft 5 in (3.18 m)
All values from NFL Combine/Pro Day

After going unselected in the 2021 NFL draft, Eagles was signed by the Dallas Cowboys as an undrafted free agent. He was released on August 17. He later had a tryout with the Green Bay Packers.

Eagles was selected in the 15th round of the 2022 USFL draft by the Philadelphia Stars. On April 15, 2022, he was signed to the team's practice squad. On May 21, he was promoted to the active roster. On June 23, he returned to the practice squad. He was a backup wide receiver and did not record any stat.

Eagles was signed by the Hamilton Tiger-Cats of the Canadian Football League (CFL) on March 23, 2023. He was released on May 11.
