= Christian Sam =

American football player (born 1996)

No. 54
- Position: Linebacker

Personal information
- Born: June 7, 1996 (age 30); Allen, Texas, U.S.
- Listed height: 6 ft 2 in (1.88 m)
- Listed weight: 240 lb (109 kg)

Career information
- High school: Allen
- College: Arizona State
- NFL draft: 2018: 6th round, 178th overall pick

Career history
- New England Patriots (2018); Miami Dolphins (2019)*; San Francisco 49ers (2019)*; Detroit Lions (2019–2020)*; Tampa Bay Bandits (2022); New Orleans Breakers (2022); Dallas Cowboys (2022)*; Arlington Renegades (2024)*; Houston Roughnecks (2024)
- * Offseason or practice squad member only

Awards and highlights
- Super Bowl champion (LIII)
- Stats at Pro Football Reference

Christian C. Sam (born June 7, 1996) is an American former professional football linebacker. He played college football at Arizona State, in 2017 leading the Pac-12 with 127 tackles, while also leading the Pac-12 with 87 solo tackles (4th-most in the NCAA). He has been a member of the New England Patriots, Miami Dolphins, San Francisco 49ers, Detroit Lions, Tampa Bay Bandits, New Orleans Breakers, and Arlington Renegades.

== Early life ==
Sam is a native of Allen, Texas, a northern suburb of Dallas, and is of Nigerian descent. His father is Prince Christian Sam and his mother is Veronica, and he is the youngest of four children. His brother Prince played cornerback for the Bulldogs football team at Louisiana Tech.

Sam attended Allen High School ('14) in Allen, Texas, where he played opposite quarterback Kyler Murray, and led the Allen Eagles football team to the Texas 5A Division I State Championships in 2012 and 2013. He was named the Defensive MVP of the 2013 Texas state championship game after tallying 5.5 tackles, a sack, and a forced fumble. That season he was also named 10-5A First Team All-District. Rivals.com rated him the No. 27 linebacker recruit in the nation, and almost every major recruiting service considered him a three-star recruit.

== College career ==
Sam committed to play football for the Arizona State Sun Devils in August 2013. He chose the Sun Devils over nearly 20 other schools, including Oklahoma, Baylor, and Texas Tech. The Sun Devils primarily used him as an inside linebacker, though he did also play snaps as an off-the-line outside linebacker and as an edge rusher.

As a true freshman in 2014, Sam played in all 13 of Arizona State's games. He tallied 16 tackles, one interception, one sack, and one pass deflection.

In 2015, as a sophomore, Sam became a full-time starter and once again appeared in all 13 of the team's games, posting 98 tackles (7th in the Pac-12 Conference; 6.5 for loss), including 68 solo tackles (5th in the Pac-12), one interception, three sacks, two pass deflections, and two forced fumbles (6th in the Pac-12).

Sam suffered a season-ending high right ankle injury in Arizona State's first game of the 2016 season. He elected to take a medical redshirt.

As a redshirt junior in 2017, Sam played in 12 games. He led the Pac-12 with 127 tackles, while also leading the Pac-12 with 87 solo tackles (4th-most in the NCAA). He also tallied one interception, 9.5 tackles for loss, three sacks, one pass deflection, and one forced fumble. He was named First Team All-League by the Associated Press, and Honorable Mention All-Pac-12. In four seasons at Arizona State, Sam made 240 total tackles, 17 tackles for loss, seven sacks, seven pass deflections, three interceptions and three forced fumbles in 40 games.

After the season, he declared for the 2018 NFL draft.

== Professional career ==
=== Pre-draft ===
Pre-draft measurables
Height	Weight	Arm length	Hand span	Wingspan	40-yard dash	10-yard split	20-yard split	20-yard shuttle	Three-cone drill	Vertical jump	Broad jump	Bench press
6 ft 1 in (1.85 m)	244 lb (111 kg)	31 1/2 in (0.80 m)	10 in (0.25 m)	6 ft 4 3/4 in (1.95 m)	4.75 s	1.68 s	2.74 s	4.20 s	7.03 s	32.0 in (0.81 m)	9 ft 6 in (2.90 m)	28 reps
All values from NFL Combine/Pro Day

At the NFL Scouting Combine, he had 28 reps in the 225-pound (102-kg) bench press, the most of anyone at the linebacker position. Sports analyst Lance Zierlein wrote: "he has enough talent to become a solid NFL backup who can step into starting reps if needed." Scouts remarked on his "active athleticism." Coach and ASU defensive coordinator Phil Benett said: "He's definitely an NFL guy ... he's playing with speed, he's playing with physicality. He does multiple skills; he stops the run, he tackles well, he blitzes, and he covers."

=== New England Patriots ===
The New England Patriots selected Sam in the sixth round (178th overall) of the 2018 NFL draft on April 28, 2018. He left ASU with a year of eligibility remaining, though he had graduated early and already earned his diploma.

On September 1, 2018, after playing three preseason games in which he had 12 tackles and an interception, Sam was placed on the team's injured reserve list at the end of preseason during the team's Super Bowl LIII season. He was part of the team when they defeated the Los Angeles Rams in Super Bowl LIII. A year later he was released during final roster cuts on August 30, 2019.

=== Miami Dolphins ===
On September 2, 2019, Sam was signed to the practice squad of the Miami Dolphins. He was released on September 11.

=== San Francisco 49ers ===
On November 5, 2019, Sam was signed to the San Francisco 49ers practice squad. He was released on December 10, 2019.

=== Detroit Lions ===
On December 17, 2019, Sam was signed to the Detroit Lions practice squad. On December 30, 2019, Sam was signed to a reserve/future contract. He was waived on August 9, 2020.

=== Tampa Bay Bandits ===
Sam was selected by the Tampa Bay Bandits of the United States Football League (USFL) in the 21st round of the 2022 USFL draft. He was released on June 7, 2022.

=== New Orleans Breakers ===
Sam was claimed off waivers by the New Orleans Breakers of the USFL on the same day, June 7, 2022. He played in nine games for the Breakers, and had 54 total tackles, eight tackles for loss, and an interception.

=== Dallas Cowboys ===
On July 8, 2022, Sam signed with the Dallas Cowboys of the NFL. Sam was the first USFL-to-NFL signing of the modern era. He was waived/injured on August 23, 2022, and placed on injured reserve. He was released on an injury release on August 25.

=== Arlington Renegades ===
On December 8, 2023, Sam signed with the Arlington Renegades of the XFL. He was placed on the team's suspended list on March 19, 2024, and waived two days later.

=== Houston Roughnecks ===
On May 14, 2024, Sam was signed by the Houston Roughnecks of the United Football League (UFL). He was released by the Roughnecks on July 23.
