= Jordan Ta'amu =

American football player (born 1997)

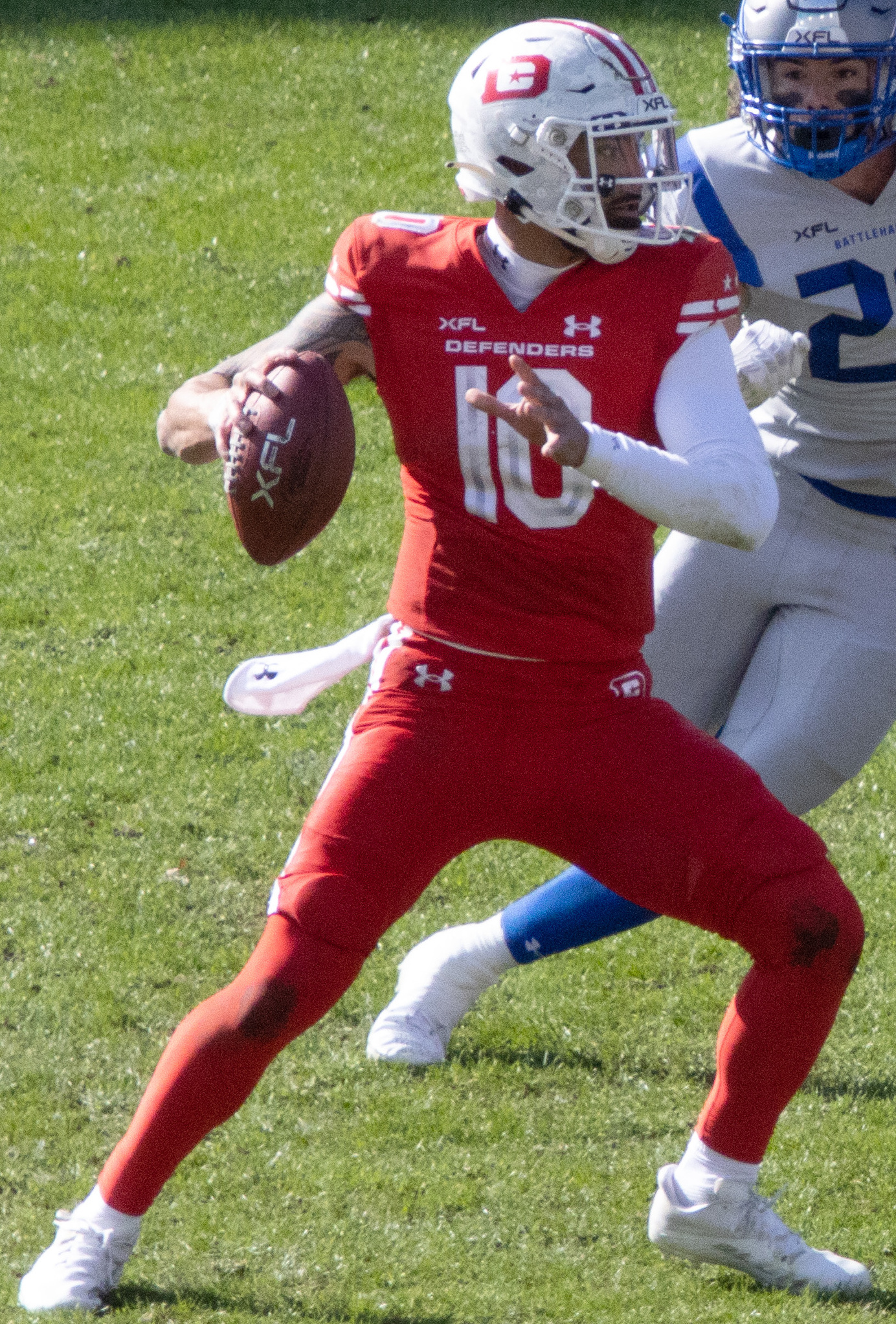
- Ta'amu with the DC Defenders in 2023

No. 10 – DC Defenders
- Position: Quarterback
- Roster status: Active

Personal information
- Born: December 10, 1997 (age 28); Pearl City, Hawaii, U.S.
- Listed height: 6 ft 3 in (1.91 m)
- Listed weight: 225 lb (102 kg)

Career information
- High school: Pearl City
- College: NMMI (2015–2016); Ole Miss (2017–2018)
- NFL draft: 2019: undrafted

Career history
- Houston Texans (2019)*; St. Louis BattleHawks (2020); Kansas City Chiefs (2020)*; Detroit Lions (2020)*; Kansas City Chiefs (2021)*; Detroit Lions (2021)*; Washington Football Team (2021)*; Carolina Panthers (2021)*; Tampa Bay Bandits (2022); DC Defenders (2023); Minnesota Vikings (2023)*; DC Defenders (2024–present)
- * Offseason or practice squad member only

Awards and highlights
- UFL champion (2025); UFL Championship Most Valuable Player (2025); UFL passing touchdowns leader (2025); XFL Offensive Player of the Year (2023); All-XFL Team (2023); USFL passing yards leader (2022); USFL passing touchdowns leader (2022)

Career spring football statistics as of 2026
- Passing attempts: 1,405
- Passing completions: 836
- Completion percentage: 59.5
- TD–INT: 79–39
- Passing yards: 10,467
- QB rating: 89.9
- Rushing yards: 1,460
- Rushing touchdowns: 8
- Stats at Pro Football Reference

Jordan Taalolo Ta'amu-Perifanos (born December 10, 1997) is an American professional football quarterback for the DC Defenders of the United Football League (UFL). He played college football for the Ole Miss Rebels. Ta'amu has been a member of several National Football League (NFL) teams and has started for the St. Louis Battlehawks and Defenders of the XFL and Tampa Bay Bandits of the United States Football League (USFL). With the Bandits, he led the 2022 USFL season in passing yardage and touchdowns. Ta'amu was named XFL Offensive Player of the Year following the 2023 XFL season with the Defenders.

== Early life and college ==
Ta'amu attended the Pearl City High School in Pearl City, Hawaii. As a senior, he passed for 1,779 yards with 29 touchdowns against four interceptions.

Ta'amu played at New Mexico Military Institute for two seasons, passing for 3,014 yards and 32 touchdowns as a sophomore. He transferred to Ole Miss in 2017, entering the season as the backup to Shea Patterson before taking over as the starter for the final five games after Patterson suffered an injury. He finished the season with 1,682 passing yards, 11 touchdowns and 4 interceptions. He also rushed for 165 yards and 4 touchdowns. With Patterson transferring to the University of Michigan, Ta'amu entered the 2018 season as the starting quarterback. In his senior season he passed for 3,918 yards, 19 touchdowns and 8 interceptions. He also rushed for 342 yards and 6 touchdowns. He finished the season ranked second in SEC passing yards, behind Alabama's Tua Tagovailoa, who played in three more games.

=== Statistics ===
Season	Team	Games			Passing								Rushing			
Season	Team	GP	GS	Record	Cmp	Att	Pct	Yds	Y/A	TD	Int	Rtg	Att	Yds	Avg	TD
2017	Ole Miss	8	5	3–2	115	173	66.5	1,682	9.7	11	4	164.5	57	165	2.9	4
2018	Ole Miss	12	12	5–7	266	418	63.6	3,918	9.4	19	8	153.5	116	342	2.9	6
Career		20	17	8–9	381	591	64.5	5,600	9.5	30	12	156.8	173	507	2.9	10

== Professional career ==
Pre-draft measurables
Height	Weight	Arm length	Hand span	Wingspan	40-yard dash	10-yard split	20-yard split	20-yard shuttle	Three-cone drill	Vertical jump	Broad jump
6 ft 2 5/8 in (1.90 m)	221 lb (100 kg)	32 1/4 in (0.82 m)	9 7/8 in (0.25 m)	6 ft 5 1/2 in (1.97 m)	4.77 s	1.59 s	2.77 s	4.36 s	7.06 s	27.5 in (0.70 m)	9 ft 1 in (2.77 m)
All values from NFL Combine

=== Houston Texans ===
On August 7, 2019, Ta'amu signed with the Houston Texans; he was released on August 30, 2019.

=== St. Louis BattleHawks ===
On October 15, 2019, Ta'amu was allocated to the St. Louis BattleHawks of the XFL, the first player for the team. He was the only one of the XFL's first eight quarterbacks to not have any professional regular season experience. He signed a contract with the team on November 4, 2019. On January 29, 2020, Ta'amu was named the starting quarterback.

During the BattleHawks first game against the Dallas Renegades on February 9, Ta'amu threw for 209 yards and a passing touchdown, while rushing for 77 yards, helping the team win a 15–9 victory against the Renegades. He had another productive game in Week 2 against the Houston Roughnecks, with 316 combined yards of offense and four total touchdowns, but threw 2 interceptions as the Battlehawks lost 24–28. After the XFL's season was cut short, Ta'amu was placed on the reserve/other league list on April 2, 2020, in order to sign with the Kansas City Chiefs. He had his contract terminated when the league suspended operations on April 10, 2020.

=== Kansas City Chiefs (first stint) ===
Ta'amu signed with the Kansas City Chiefs on April 2, 2020. On September 5, 2020, he was waived. He was signed to the practice squad the following day. On October 3, 2020, he tested positive for COVID-19 and was placed on the practice squad/COVID-19 reserve list. He was removed from the COVID-19 list on October 21. He was released on October 27.

=== Detroit Lions (first stint) ===
On December 16, 2020, Ta'amu was signed to the Detroit Lions' practice squad.

=== Kansas City Chiefs (second stint) ===
Ta'amu was signed to a reserve/future contract on January 12, 2021. He was waived on May 10, 2021.

=== Detroit Lions (second stint) ===
Ta'amu signed with the Detroit Lions on August 17, 2021. He was cut six days later on August 23, 2021.

=== Washington Football Team ===
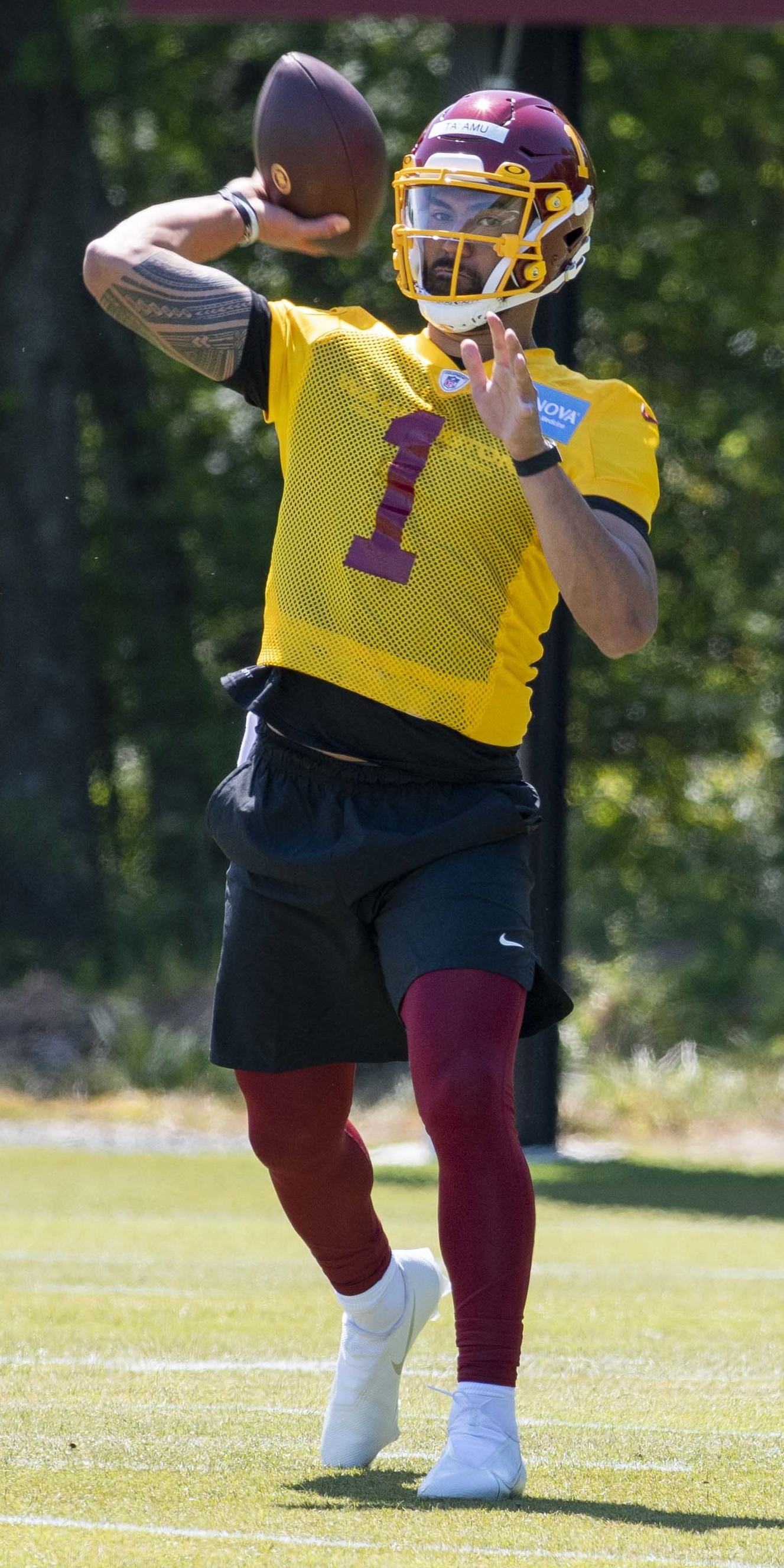
Ta'amu with the Washington Football Team in 2021

On December 15, 2021, Ta'amu was signed to the Washington Football Team's practice squad, but was released eight days later. During this time, the starting quarterback for Washington was Taylor Heinicke, who was Ta'amu's back up in the XFL.

=== Carolina Panthers ===
On December 30, 2021, Ta'amu was signed to the Carolina Panthers practice squad. He was released on January 4, 2022.

=== Tampa Bay Bandits ===
Ta'amu was selected with the second pick of the 2022 USFL draft by the Tampa Bay Bandits. He led the USFL in passing yards at 2,014 and touchdowns with 14.

=== DC Defenders (first stint) ===
Ta'amu was assigned to the DC Defenders of the XFL on January 6, 2023. On May 5, 2023, Ta'amu was announced as the XFL's 2023 Offensive Player of the Year. He was released from his contract on August 18, 2023.

=== Minnesota Vikings ===
On August 21, 2023, he was signed by the Minnesota Vikings. He was waived on August 28.

On September 9, 2023, Ta'amu was revealed to be claimed by the Saskatchewan Roughriders of the Canadian Football League on their negotiation list, as part of the league mandate making ten names from that list public. Under the CFL's terms of employment, the Roughriders will hold exclusive rights to Ta'amu should he seek to play in the CFL unless they remove him from the list. When negotiation lists and transactions became public in 2025, Ta'amu was no longer claimed by a CFL team, but has since been added by the BC Lions.

=== DC Defenders (second stint) ===
Ta'amu re-signed with the Defenders on February 22, 2024.

On January 14, 2025, Ta'amu re-signed with the Defenders for the 2025 UFL season. In week 7, Ta'amu completed 19–of–24 passes for 278 yards and 3 touchdowns. For his performance, he would be named the UFL offensive player of the week. Ta'amu would finish the season leading the league in passing touchdowns with 17. On June 14, 2025, Ta'amu was named the UFL Championship Game MVP after he set a UFL record of 390 passing yards and had 5 total touchdowns. The Defenders offense would set a UFL record with 58 total points as they defeated the Michigan Panthers 58–34.

Ta'amu returned to the Defenders for the 2026 season via the 2026 UFL draft for quarterbacks in January 2026. During a Week 6 matchup against the Dallas Renegades, Ta'amu surpassed 10,000 career passing yards in spring football, joining Bobby Hebert, Chuck Fusina, John Reaves, and Johnnie Walton as the only American professional spring football quarterbacks to accomplish the milestone. In the 24–6 victory, he completed 20 of 28 passes for 227 yards, three touchdowns, and one interception. Heading into consecutive matchups against the Louisville Kings with a league-best 5–1 record, Ta'amu threw for a season-high 353 yards on 18 of 33 passing with two touchdowns and two interceptions in a 30–13 loss. In the rematch the following week, Ta'amu suffered a season-ending right knee injury during the first half. On the season, he completed 109 of 177 passes for 1,516 yards with 14 touchdowns and nine interceptions, while adding 196 rushing yards.

== Career statistics ==
Legend
	Championship Game MVP
	League champion
	Offensive Player of the Year
	Led the league
**Bold**	Career high

Regular season statistics
Year	Team	League	Games			Passing									Rushing					Sacks	
Year	Team	League	GP	GS	Record	Cmp	Att	Pct	Yds	Y/A	Lng	TD	Int	Rtg	Att	Yds	Y/A	Lng	TD	Sck	SckY
2020	STL	XFL	5	5	3–2	97	134	**72.4**	1,050	7.8	43	5	2	101.3	41	217	5.3	37	1	12	81
2022	TB	USFL	10	10	4–6	**172**	**302**	57.0	2,014	6.7	75	14	12	76.2	59	**365**	**6.2**	22	1	**25**	**182**
2023	DC	XFL	10	10	**9–1**	142	227	62.6	1,878	**8.3**	**86**	14	3	**103.7**	**67**	301	4.5	**49**	**3**	6	27
2024	DC	UFL	10	10	4–6	161	280	57.5	1,854	6.6	70	15	9	82.1	43	203	4.7	22	1	19	110
2025	DC	UFL	9	9	6–3	155	285	54.4	**2,155**	7.6	76	**17**	4	92.9	41	178	4.4	12	2	7	46
2026	DC	UFL	8	8	5–3	109	177	61.6	1,516	8.6	81	14	9	94.3	46	196	4.3	22	0	22	153
Career			52	52	31–21	836	1,405	59.5	10,467	7.4	86	79	39	89.9	297	1,460	4.9	49	8	91	599

Postseason statistics
Year	Team	League	Games			Passing									Rushing					Sacks	
Year	Team	League	GP	GS	Record	Cmp	Att	Pct	Yds	Y/A	Lng	TD	Int	Rtg	Att	Yds	Y/A	Lng	TD	Sck	SckY
2023	DC	XFL	2	2	1–1	35	61	57.4	503	8.2	72	4	5	72.0	6	34	5.7	13	0	2	4
2025	DC	UFL	2	2	2–0	39	54	72.2	594	11.0	73	5	1	131.3	10	41	4.1	11	1	2	3
2026	DC	UFL	0	0	—	Did not play due to injury															
Career			4	4	3–1	74	115	64.3	1,097	9.5	73	9	6	99.8	16	75	4.7	13	1	4	7
