= Darius Harper =

American football player (born 1997)

Profile
- Position: Offensive tackle

Personal information
- Born: October 10, 1997 (age 29); Springfield, Ohio, U.S.
- Listed height: 6 ft 7 in (2.01 m)
- Listed weight: 300 lb (136 kg)

Career information
- High school: Springfield (Springfield, Ohio)
- College: Miami (OH) (2016–2017); Cincinnati (2018–2020)
- NFL draft: 2021: undrafted

Career history
- Los Angeles Chargers (2021)*; Birmingham Stallions (2022–2024); DC Defenders (2025)*; Birmingham Stallions (2025)
- * Offseason or practice squad member only

Awards and highlights
- 2× USFL champion (2022, 2023); UFL champion (2024)
- Stats at Pro Football Reference

Darius Harper (born October 10, 1997) is an American professional football offensive tackle. He played college basketball at Miami (OH) and college football at Cincinnati.

== College career ==
=== Basketball ===
Before playing football, Harper played college basketball at Miami (Ohio) after graduating from high school. He started 14 of 30 games and totaled 87 points, 64 rebounds, 7 steals, 2 assists and 8 blocks in 360 minutes. During his second season at Miami (Ohio), Harper did not see as much playing time. He started no games and totaled 4 points and 4 rebounds in just 23 minutes.

=== Football ===
In 2018, Harper transferred to Cincinnati where he played in 2 games. In his second year in 2019, Harper started 8 out of 14 games and helped his team win the American Athletic Conference East Division Championship. He was also named to the 2019 AAC All-Academic Team.

In his last year in 2020, Harper started 10 games and helped his offensive line become a semifinalist for the Joe Moore Award. He also earned his bachelor's degree in criminal justice and an Honorable Mention All-AAC.

== Professional career ==
Pre-draft measurables
Height	Weight	Arm length	Hand span	40-yard dash	10-yard split	20-yard split	20-yard shuttle	Three-cone drill	Vertical jump	Broad jump	Bench press
6 ft 6 5/8 in (2.00 m)	300 lb (136 kg)	33 5/8 in (0.85 m)	9 3/8 in (0.24 m)	5.05 s	1.79 s	2.96 s	4.54 s	7.70 s	30.5 in (0.77 m)	8 ft 9 in (2.67 m)	16 reps
All values from Pro Day

=== Los Angeles Chargers ===
Harper was signed by the Los Angeles Chargers as an undrafted free agent on May 1, 2021. Harper was waived on August 30, 2021.

=== Birmingham Stallions ===
Harper was selected in the 5th round of the 2022 USFL draft by the Birmingham Stallions. He re-signed with the team on July 29, 2023, and again on August 19, 2024. He was released on January 30, 2025.

=== DC Defenders ===
On January 31, 2025, Harper signed with the DC Defenders of the United Football League (UFL). He was released on April 15, 2025.

=== Birmingham Stallions (second stint) ===
On April 16, 2025, Harper re-signed with the Stallions.
