= Greg Reaves =

American football player (born 1996)

Profile
- Position: Defensive lineman

Personal information
- Born: August 20, 1996 (age 30)
- Listed height: 6 ft 2 in (1.88 m)
- Listed weight: 241 lb (109 kg)

Career information
- High school: Manatee (Bradenton, Florida)
- College: South Florida (2015–2019)
- NFL draft: 2020: undrafted

Career history
- Los Angeles Rams (2020)*; Tampa Bay Bandits (2022); Memphis Showboats (2023–2024); Toronto Argonauts (2025)
- * Offseason or practice squad member only
- Stats at CFL.ca

Greg Reaves (born August 20, 1996) is an American professional football defensive lineman. He played college football at South Florida.

== Early life ==
Greg Reaves was born on August 20, 1996. He played high school football at Manatee High School in Bradenton, Florida. Manatee High won the state title during Reaves' freshman year in 2011. He recorded 87 tackles, one sack, one forced fumble, and one interception as a senior in 2014, earning Manatee County Defensive Player of the Year and All-State honors. He also participated in basketball and track in high school.

== College career ==
After graduating from the United States Air Force Academy Preparatory School, Reaves was planning to play college football for the Air Force Falcons. However, he instead decided to walk-on to the University of South Florida and play for the South Florida Bulls. He did not play in any games during his first season in 2015. He earned the team's Scout Team Award for defense and was also named to the American Athletic Conference (AAC) All-Academic Team. Reaves played in eight games in 2016, posting four solo tackles and one assisted tackle. He was awarded a scholarship in 2017. He appeared in all 12 games during the 2017 season, totaling 32 solo tackles, 19 assisted tackles, four sacks, and three pass breakups, garnering AAC All-Academic Team recognition for the second time. Reaves started all 13 games in 2018, starting the first six at defensive end and the last seven at middle linebacker after an injury to Nico Sawtelle. Overall in 2018, Reaves totaled 47 solo tackles, 42 assisted tackles, 0.5 sacks, one fumble recovery, and one pass breakup. He was named to the AAC All-Academic Team for the third time. He started all 12 games on the defensive line during his senior year in 2019, posting 36 solo tackles, 27 assisted tackles, four sacks, two fumble recoveries, one interception, and two pass breakups. Reaves earned ACC All-Academic honors for the fourth time. He graduated with a bachelor’s degree in management in summer 2018. He also later graduated with a master's degree in entrepreneurship and 3.8 grade point average.

== Professional career ==
After going undrafted in the 2020 NFL draft, Reaves signed with the Los Angeles Rams on April 30, 2020. He was waived on August 1, 2020. The San Francisco 49ers offered Reaves a workout in 2021 but rescinded after learning that Reaves had not yet received his COVID-19 vaccine.

On February 23, 2022, Reaves was selected by the Tampa Bay Bandits in the 2022 USFL draft. He played in all ten games for the Bandits during the 2022 USFL season, recording 37 tackles, three sacks, two forced fumbles, and four pass breakups.

Reaves played in all ten games, starting seven, for the Memphis Showboats of the USFL in 2023, totaling 33 tackles, 4.5 sacks, one forced fumble, one fumble recovery, two interceptions, and three pass breakups. On August 14, 2023, he re-signed with Memphis for the 2024 season. He started all ten games for the Showboats in 2024, accumulating 22 tackles, 3.5 sacks, one forced fumble, and one pass breakup. The Showboats finished the year with a 2–8 record. On August 28, 2024, Reaves re-signed with Memphis for the 2025 season. However, he was waived on January 22, 2025.

Reaves signed with the Toronto Argonauts of the Canadian Football League February 10, 2025. He was moved to the practice roster on June 1, promoted to the active roster on June 27, and moved back to the practice roster on July 15, 2025. He was released on May 31, 2026, as part of final roster cuts.
