= Eric Assoua =

American football player (born 1997)

No. 99
- Position: Defensive end

Personal information
- Born: February 6, 1997 (age 29)
- Listed height: 6 ft 2 in (1.88 m)
- Listed weight: 250 lb (113 kg)

Career information
- High school: St. John's College HS (Washington, D.C.)
- College: Western Michigan (2015–2018)
- NFL draft: 2019: undrafted

Career history
- Oakland Raiders (2019)*; BC Lions (2020)*; Alphas (2021); Pittsburgh Maulers (2022); St. Louis Battlehawks (2023)*
- * Offseason or practice squad member only

Eric Assoua (born February 6, 1997) is an American former professional football defensive end. He played college football for the Western Michigan Broncos.

== Early life ==
Assoua attended high school at St. John's College High School. In 2014, he was selected Washington Post Fall All-Met First-team Defense, DMVelite Third-team Defense and WCAC First-team All-Conference. Coming out of high school, he was a 3 star recruit, having offers from Western Michigan, Boston College, Bowling Green and Toledo. He committed to Western Michigan.

== College career ==
In the 2015 season, Assoua played in 11 games, totaling 14 tackles for the Western Michigan Broncos. In his sophomore season, he played in all 14 games and starting in nine, totaling 47 tackles. In the 2017 season, he played and started in nine games, only recording 18 tackles and two sacks.

In his last season, he played 13 games having 18 tackles and 4.5 sacks. He also played in the lost 2018 Famous Idaho Potato Bowl. He earned a varsity letter in all his years at Western Michigan.

== Professional career ==
Assoua went undrafted in the 2019 NFL draft. He was invited to a rookie minicamp by the Oakland Raiders in April 2019. He signed with the BC Lions for the 2020 CFL season, but that season was canceled due to COVID-19. In 2021, he played in The Spring League for the Alphas.

He was chosen in the 2022 USFL draft by the Pittsburgh Maulers. He played in the 2022 USFL season for the Pittsburgh Maulers. After a XFL-combine in August 2023 he was assigned to the St. Louis Battlehawks.
