= Delrick Abrams =

American football player (born 1997)

Profile
- Position: Cornerback

Personal information
- Born: April 6, 1997 (age 29); Bogalusa, Louisiana, U.S.
- Listed height: 6 ft 3 in (1.91 m)
- Listed weight: 180 lb (82 kg)

Career information
- High school: Varnado High School (Varnado, Louisiana)
- College: Independence CC (2016–2017); Colorado (2018–2019)
- NFL draft: 2020: undrafted

Career history
- Atlanta Falcons (2020); Los Angeles Rams (2021)*; Tampa Bay Bandits (2022); Memphis Showboats (2023–2024)
- * Offseason or practice squad member only

Career NFL statistics
- Games played: 3
- Stats at Pro Football Reference

Delrick Abrams Jr. (born April 6, 1997) is an American professional football cornerback. He played college football for the Colorado Buffaloes and at junior college football for the Independence Pirates.

Abrams was signed as an undrafted free agent by the Atlanta Falcons of the National Football League (NFL), and played a number of games in the 2020 season. He played two seasons in the United States Football League (USFL) with the Tampa Bay Bandits and Memphis Showboats. He spent a season in the United Football League (UFL), also with the Showboats.

== High School ==
Abrams was born in Bogalusa, Louisiana and graduated from Varnado High School in Angie, Louisiana, a small school with less than 180 high school students.

== College career ==
Abrams attended Independence Community College, where he played two seasons with the Independence Pirates. While at Independence, he was featured in the third season of the Netflix documentary series Last Chance U, where he played under head coach Jason Brown. He transferred to the University of Colorado Boulder, where he played two seasons with the Colorado Buffaloes.

== Professional career ==
Abrams signed with the Atlanta Falcons as an undrafted free agent following the 2020 NFL draft on April 27, 2020. He was waived during final roster cuts on September 5, and signed to the team's practice squad the next day. He was elevated to the active roster on September 26 for the team's week 3 game against the Chicago Bears, and reverted to the practice squad after the game. He made his NFL debut in the game, playing one snap on defense and 10 snaps on special teams. He was elevated again on October 5 and December 19 for the weeks 4 and 15 games against the Green Bay Packers and Tampa Bay Buccaneers, and reverted to the practice squad again following each game. He signed a reserve/future contract on January 4, 2021.

On August 31, 2021, Abrams was waived by the Falcons. On December 18, Abrams was signed to the Los Angeles Rams practice squad, but was released three days later.

Abrams was selected with the first pick of the eighth round of the 2022 USFL draft by the Tampa Bay Bandits. Abrams and all other Bandits players were all transferred to the Memphis Showboats after it was announced that the Bandits were taking a hiatus and that the Showboats were joining the league. Abrams re-signed with the Showboats on September 30, 2023.
