= Tyler Catalina =

American gridiron football player (born 1993)

No. 68
- Position: Offensive tackle

Personal information
- Born: January 24, 1993 (age 33); Worcester, Massachusetts, U.S.
- Listed height: 6 ft 6 in (1.98 m)
- Listed weight: 315 lb (143 kg)

Career information
- High school: Wachusett Regional (Holden, Massachusetts)
- College: Rhode Island (2013–2015), Georgia (2016)
- NFL draft: 2017: undrafted

Career history
- Washington Redskins (2017–2018); Minnesota Vikings (2019)*; Carolina Panthers (2019)*; Ottawa Redblacks (2020–2021); Tampa Bay Bandits (2022); DC Defenders (2023)*
- * Offseason or practice squad member only

Awards and highlights
- Second-team All-CAA (2015); Third-team All-CAA (2014)

Career NFL statistics
- Games played: 9
- Games started: 2
- Stats at Pro Football Reference

Tyler Catalina (born January 24, 1993) is an American former professional football player who was an offensive tackle in the National Football League (NFL). He played college football for the Rhode Island Rams for three seasons before finishing his career with the Georgia Bulldogs. He was signed by the Washington Redskins as an undrafted free agent in 2017.

== College career ==
Catalina played collegiately at the University of Rhode Island (2013–2015) and University of Georgia (2016). He started 12 games at right tackle as a freshman in 2013. He then started ten games at left tackle the following season, garnering third-team all-conference honors. The next year, he started 11 games at left tackle as a junior team captain in 2015, earning second-team All-CAA honors. In his lone season at Georgia, he started 12 games at left tackle.

== Professional career ==
=== Washington Redskins ===
Catalina signed with the Washington Redskins as an undrafted free agent on May 4, 2017. After a strong performance in training camp and the preseason, Catalina made the Redskins final roster. He made his NFL debut in Week 8 against the Cowboys, starting at right guard in place of an injured Brandon Scherff. He was waived by the Redskins on November 11, 2017, but was re-signed five days later.

On September 1, 2018, Catalina was placed on injured reserve after having shoulder surgery. He was waived on July 31, 2019.

=== Minnesota Vikings ===
On August 1, 2019, Catalina was claimed off waivers by the Minnesota Vikings, but was waived ten days later.

=== Carolina Panthers ===
On August 19, 2019, Catalina was signed by the Carolina Panthers. He was waived during final roster cuts on August 30, 2019.

=== Ottawa Redblacks ===
Catalina signed with the Ottawa Redblacks on February 18, 2020. After the CFL canceled the 2020 season due to the COVID-19 pandemic, Catalina chose to opt-out of his contract with the Redblacks on September 3, 2020. He re-signed with the Redblacks on February 5, 2021.

=== Tampa Bay Bandits ===
Catalina was selected by the Tampa Bay Bandits on February 22, 2022, with the eighth pick of the fifth round of the 2022 USFL draft.

=== DC Defenders ===
On January 1, 2023, Catalina was selected by the DC Defenders in the fifth round of the 2023 XFL Supplemental Draft.
