= Daylon Mack =

American football player (born 1997)

Profile
- Position: Nose tackle

Personal information
- Born: February 23, 1997 (age 29); Gladewater, Texas, U.S.
- Listed height: 6 ft 1 in (1.85 m)
- Listed weight: 340 lb (154 kg)

Career information
- High school: Gladewater
- College: Texas A&M (2015–2018)
- NFL draft: 2019: 5th round, 160th overall pick

Career history
- Baltimore Ravens (2019); Detroit Lions (2020)*; New York Giants (2020)*; Green Bay Packers (2020)*; Arizona Cardinals (2020)*; Tennessee Titans (2021)*; Tampa Bay Bandits (2022); Memphis Showboats (2023–2024)
- * Offseason or practice squad member only
- Stats at Pro Football Reference

Daylon Mack (born February 23, 1997) is an American professional football nose tackle. He played college football at Texas A&M. He was selected in the fifth round of the 2019 NFL draft by the Baltimore Ravens.

== Professional career ==
Pre-draft measurables
Height	Weight	Arm length	Hand span	40-yard dash	20-yard shuttle	Three-cone drill	Vertical jump	Broad jump	Bench press
6 ft 1 in (1.85 m)	336 lb (152 kg)	31 1/4 in (0.79 m)	10 1/4 in (0.26 m)	5.10 s	4.95 s	8.02 s	27.0 in (0.69 m)	8 ft 6 in (2.59 m)	30 reps
All values from NFL Combine

=== Baltimore Ravens ===
Mack was selected by the Baltimore Ravens in the fifth round, 160th overall, of the 2019 NFL draft. On November 12, 2019, Mack was placed on injured reserve with a leg injury.

On August 1, 2020, Mack was waived to get below the required 80-man roster limit for training camp under the revised COVID-19 rules.

=== Detroit Lions ===
Mack was claimed off of waivers by the Detroit Lions on August 2, 2020, but was waived five days later with a failed physical designation.

=== New York Giants ===
Mack was signed by the New York Giants on August 17, 2020. He was waived by the Giants on September 5.

=== Green Bay Packers ===
On September 10, 2020, Mack was signed to the practice squad of the Green Bay Packers. He was released by the Packers on September 16.

=== Arizona Cardinals ===
On November 24, 2020, Mack was signed to the Arizona Cardinals' practice squad. Mack was released by Arizona on December 21.

=== Tennessee Titans ===
On January 14, 2021, Mack signed a reserve/future contract with the Tennessee Titans. He was waived by the Titans on June 3.

=== Tampa Bay Bandits ===
Mack was drafted by the Tampa Bay Bandits of the United States Football League (USFL) in the 24th round of the 2022 USFL draft. He was transferred to the team's inactive roster on April 22, 2022, due to a thigh injury. He was transferred to the active roster on April 30.

=== Memphis Showboats ===
Mack and all other Bandits players were all transferred to the Memphis Showboats after it was announced that the Bandits were taking a hiatus and that the Showboats were joining the league. Mack was placed on injured reserve on April 19, 2023. He re-signed with the Showboats on September 6, and again on August 30, 2024. Mack was released by Memphis on November 26.
