= Christian Campbell (cornerback) =

American gridiron football player (born 1995)

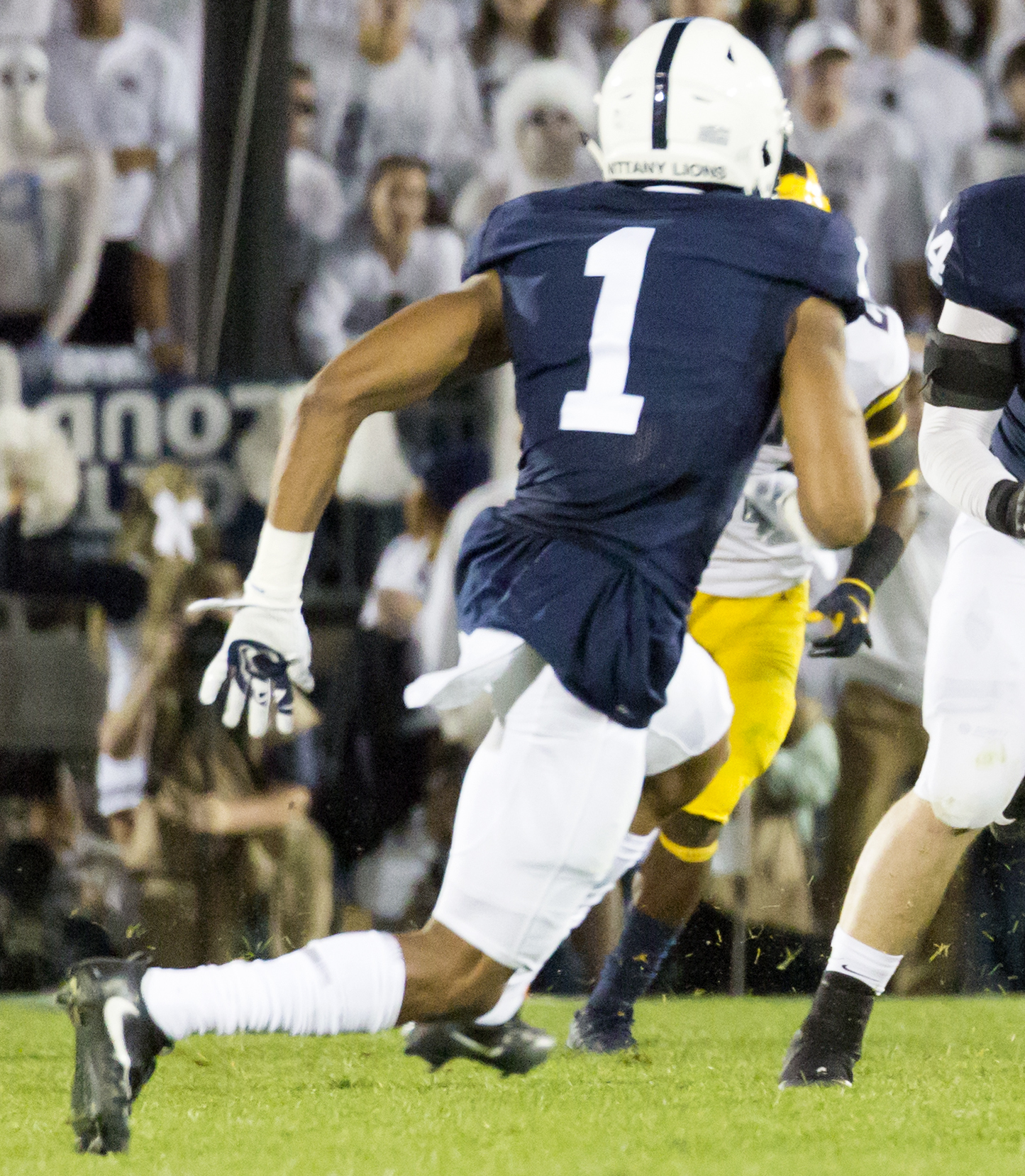
- Campbell with the Penn State Nittany Lions in 2017

No. 1
- Position: Cornerback

Personal information
- Born: November 27, 1995 (age 30); Phenix City, Alabama, U.S.
- Listed height: 6 ft 1 in (1.85 m)
- Listed weight: 195 lb (88 kg)

Career information
- High school: Central (AL)
- College: Penn State
- NFL draft: 2018: 6th round, 182nd overall pick

Career history
- Arizona Cardinals (2018)*; New Orleans Saints (2018–2019)*; San Francisco 49ers (2019)*; Saskatchewan Roughriders (2020–2021); Tampa Bay Bandits (2022); Memphis Showboats (2023)*; Edmonton Elks (2023)*
- * Offseason or practice squad member only
- Stats at Pro Football Reference

Christian Campbell (born November 27, 1995) is an American former professional football cornerback. He played college football at Penn State. Campbell was also a member of the Arizona Cardinals, New Orleans Saints, San Francisco 49ers, Tampa Bay Bandits, Memphis Showboats, and Edmonton Elks.

== Professional career ==
=== Arizona Cardinals ===
Campbell was selected by the Arizona Cardinals in the sixth round (182nd overall) of the 2018 NFL draft. The pick used to select him was previously acquired from the Denver Broncos in exchange for Jared Veldheer. On May 11, 2018, he signed his rookie contract. He was waived on September 1, 2018.

=== New Orleans Saints ===
On October 17, 2018, Campbell was signed to the practice squad of the New Orleans Saints. He signed a reserve/future contract with the Saints on January 21, 2019. He was waived/injured on July 30, 2019, and placed on injured reserve. He was waived from injured reserve on August 22.

=== San Francisco 49ers ===
On August 27, 2019, Campbell was signed by the San Francisco 49ers. He was waived during final roster cuts on August 30, 2019.

=== Saskatchewan Roughriders ===
Campbell signed with the Saskatchewan Roughriders of the Canadian Football League (CFL) on March 20, 2020. After the CFL canceled the 2020 season due to the COVID-19 pandemic, Campbell chose to opt-out of his contract with the Roughriders on August 28, 2020. He opted back in to his contract on January 20, 2021. He dressed for five games and recorded eight tackles at boundary cornerback and field-side halfback.

=== Tampa Bay Bandits ===
Campbell was selected by the Tampa Bay Bandits of the United States Football League (USFL) with the first pick of the tenth round of the 2022 USFL draft. He was transferred to the team's inactive roster on May 6, 2022, with a thigh injury. He was moved back to the active roster on May 11. He was moved back to the inactive roster on May 20 with the thigh injury.

=== Memphis Showboats ===
On December 1, 2022, Campbell and all other Bandits players were all transferred to the Memphis Showboats after it was announced that the Bandits were taking a hiatus and that the Showboats were joining the league. On January 11, 2023, Campbell was released by the Showboats.

=== Edmonton Elks ===
On May 18, 2023, it was announced that Campbell was returning to the CFL, this time joining the Edmonton Elks. On June 2, 2023, Campbell was released by the Elks.
