= Eli Rogers =

American football player (born 1992)

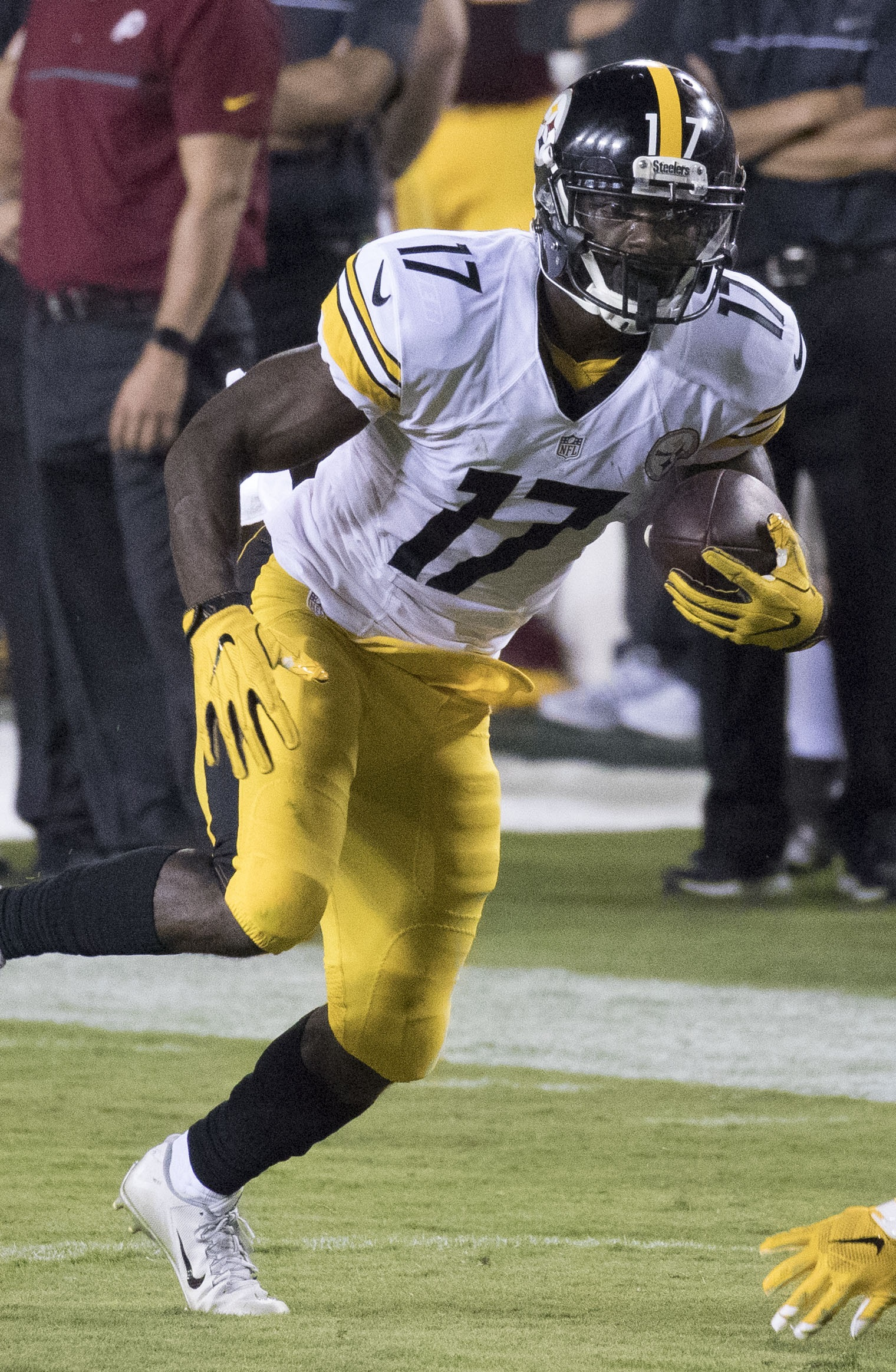
- Rogers with the Pittsburgh Steelers in 2016

No. 17
- Position: Wide receiver

Personal information
- Born: December 23, 1992 (age 33); Miami, Florida, U.S.
- Listed height: 5 ft 10 in (1.78 m)
- Listed weight: 187 lb (85 kg)

Career information
- High school: Miami Northwestern
- College: Louisville
- NFL draft: 2015: undrafted

Career history
- Pittsburgh Steelers (2015–2018); DC Defenders (2020); Montreal Alouettes (2021)*; Tampa Bay Bandits (2022)*; Orlando Guardians (2023)
- * Offseason or practice squad member only

Career NFL statistics
- Receptions: 78
- Receiving yards: 822
- Receiving touchdowns: 4
- Stats at Pro Football Reference

Eli Lamar Rogers (born December 23, 1992) is an American former professional football player who was a wide receiver in the National Football League (NFL). He played college football for the Louisville Cardinals. He was signed by the Pittsburgh Steelers as an undrafted free agent in 2015.

== Early life ==
Rogers played for head coach Billy Rolle at Northwestern High School. Among his teammates was future Pittsburgh Steelers teammate Artie Burns. He joined teammates Teddy Bridgewater, Amari Cooper, Michaelee Harris, Corvin Lamb, and Jermaine Reve when he played in the Under Armour All-American Game. A four-star prospect by Rivals.com and rated as the No. 35 wide receiver, Rogers recorded 59 receptions for 691 receiving yards with three scores as a senior despite being injured for two games.

== College career ==
As a freshman at the University of Louisville in 2011, Rogers played for the Louisville Cardinals. On October 15, Rogers recorded the Cardinals' longest reception, 58 yards against the Cincinnati Bearcats at Paul Brown Stadium, but lost the game, 25–16. Rogers had a productive season that led the Louisville Cardinals to the 2011 Belk Bowl, but the team lost against the NC State Wolfpack, 31–24. Rogers finished third in school history in receptions and sixth in receiving yards. Rogers finished the season with 454 receiving yards, 41 receptions, 1 touchdown. He had 7 receptions and eight punt returns for 54 yards in the 2013 Belk Bowl.

In 2012, Rogers finished second on the team with 46 receptions and third with 505 receiving yards and 4 touchdowns. He also had a career-high 10 receptions against Syracuse. In the Sugar Bowl he had 4 catches for 61 yards in a win over Florida.

As a junior in 2013, Rogers played in all 13 games with one start. He finished third on the team with 44 receptions and 536 receiving yards. He also tied his career-high of 10 receptions in a game against UCF and his career-high of 4 receiving touchdowns during the season. He led the Cardinals to the 2013 Russell Athletic Bowl, winning 36–9 over the Miami Hurricanes.

During his senior year in 2014, Rogers saw action in all 13 games and had 45 receptions, 525 receiving yards and 3 receiving touchdowns. He also had a career-high 112 punt return yards.

== Professional career ==
=== Pre-draft ===
Coming out of Louisville, Rogers was projected to go undrafted in the 2015 NFL draft and was not a highly sought after undrafted free agent. He also did not receive an invitation to the NFL Combine. On March 11, 2015, he participated at Louisville's pro day and performed all of the required combine and positional drills for team representatives and scouts. Representatives from all 32 NFL teams were present, including New England Patriots head coach Bill Belichick, Steelers head coach Mike Tomlin, Cincinnati Bengals head coach Marvin Lewis, and Steelers general manager Kevin Colbert to scout Rogers, DeVante Parker, Jamon Brown, Gerald Christian, Gerod Holliman, and 17 other prospects. He was ranked as the 132nd-best wide receiver prospect available in the draft by NFLDraftScout.com.

Pre-draft measurables
Height	Weight	Arm length	Hand span	40-yard dash	10-yard split	20-yard split	20-yard shuttle	Three-cone drill	Vertical jump	Broad jump	Bench press
5 ft 10 in (1.78 m)	187 lb (85 kg)	29 7/8 in (0.76 m)	9 in (0.23 m)	4.57 s	1.57 s	2.62 s	4.10 s	6.71 s	34.5 in (0.88 m)	9 ft 9 in (2.97 m)	19 reps
All values from Louisville Pro Day

=== Pittsburgh Steelers ===
==== 2015 ====
Rogers signed a three-year contract worth $1.575 million as an undrafted free agent with the Steelers. He spent the entire 2015 season on injured reserve.

==== 2016 ====
Rogers entered training camp in 2016 competing with Cobi Hamilton, Demarcus Ayers, and Marcus Tucker to be the Steelers' fifth wide receiver. The Steelers named Rogers their fifth wide receiver to begin the season.

He earned his first career start in the season opener after Markus Wheaton was unable to play due to a shoulder injury. He finished the 38–16 victory against the Washington Redskins with six receptions for 59 yards and a touchdown. Rogers' first career touchdown reception came on a three-yard pass from Ben Roethlisberger.

During a Week 9 contest against the Baltimore Ravens, he led the Steelers in receiving yards after making six catches for a career-high 103 yards. The following week, Rogers started his fourth game of the season and caught four passes for 42 yards and a touchdown during a 35–30 loss to the Dallas Cowboys. On December 28, 2016, he made five receptions for 75 yards and caught the go-ahead touchdown on a 24-yard pass from Roethlisberger with less than 3:30 left in the game to help the Steelers defeat the Bengals 24–20. Rogers finished his first active season with 48 receptions for 594 yards and three touchdowns in 13 games and eight starts. His 72.7% catch rate ranked tenth among all NFL wide receivers in 2016.

==== 2017 ====
With a crowded position at wide receiver in 2017, Rogers entered training camp competing with Sammie Coates, JuJu Smith-Schuster, Cobi Hamilton, Darrius Heyward-Bey, Justin Hunter, and Demarcus Ayers for a job as a backup wide receiver. He was able to impress team officials enough to be named the Steelers' fourth wide receiver to begin the regular season, behind Antonio Brown, Martavis Bryant, and Heyward-Bey.

He earned his first start of the season as the Steelers' slot receiver during a 21–18 season-opening victory over the Cleveland Browns, finishing with two receptions for 11 yards. The following game, Rogers caught four passes for 43 yards in a 26–9 victory over the Vikings. Rogers was a healthy scratch for Weeks 3 and 4, with the Steelers choosing to play Smith-Schuster and Hunter. He finished the season with 18 receptions for 149 yards and one touchdown. In the divisional round of the playoffs against the Jacksonville Jaguars, Rogers suffered a torn ACL, causing the Steelers to not tender him a contract, as he was set to be a restricted free agent in 2018.

==== 2018 ====
On July 25, 2018, after visits with the Chiefs and Browns, Rogers re-signed with the Steelers on a one-year deal. He was suspended the first game of the season for violating the NFL Policy and Program for Substances of Abuse. On September 1, Rogers was placed on the physically unable to perform list to start the season while recovering from the torn ACL. He was activated off PUP on December 15. Rogers recorded 20 yards on four receptions in his first game back against the New England Patriots and finished the season with 12 receptions for 57 yards in three games.

==== 2019 ====
On March 14, 2019, Rogers signed a two-year contract extension with the Steelers. He was released on August 31, 2019.

=== DC Defenders ===
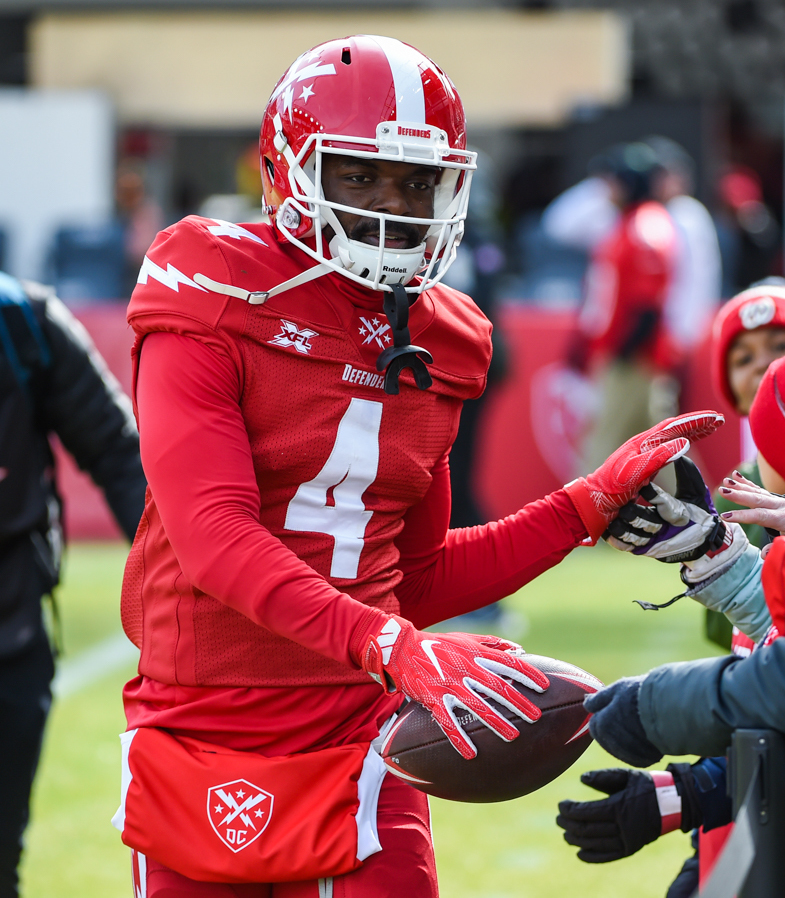
Rogers with the DC Defenders in 2020

On November 22, 2019, Rogers was selected by the DC Defenders of the XFL in the 2020 XFL Supplemental Draft. In his first game with the Defenders, Rogers hauled in 6 passes for 73 yards in the 31–19 win against the Seattle Dragons. On February 15, 2020, Rogers played in a week two game for the Defenders, which took place during his mother's funeral. She had died earlier in the week. He had his contract terminated when the league suspended operations on April 10.

=== Montreal Alouettes ===
Rogers signed with the Montreal Alouettes of the Canadian Football League on January 22, 2021.

=== Tampa Bay Bandits ===
Rogers was selected by the Tampa Bay Bandits of the United States Football League (USFL) in the 13th round of the 2022 USFL draft. He was placed on the reserved list on April 1, 2022.

=== Orlando Guardians ===
On January 1, 2023, The Orlando Guardians of the XFL selected Rogers in the first round of the 2023 XFL Supplemental Draft. The Guardians folded when the XFL and USFL merged to create the United Football League (UFL).
