= Bob Saunders (American football) =

American football coach (born 1976)

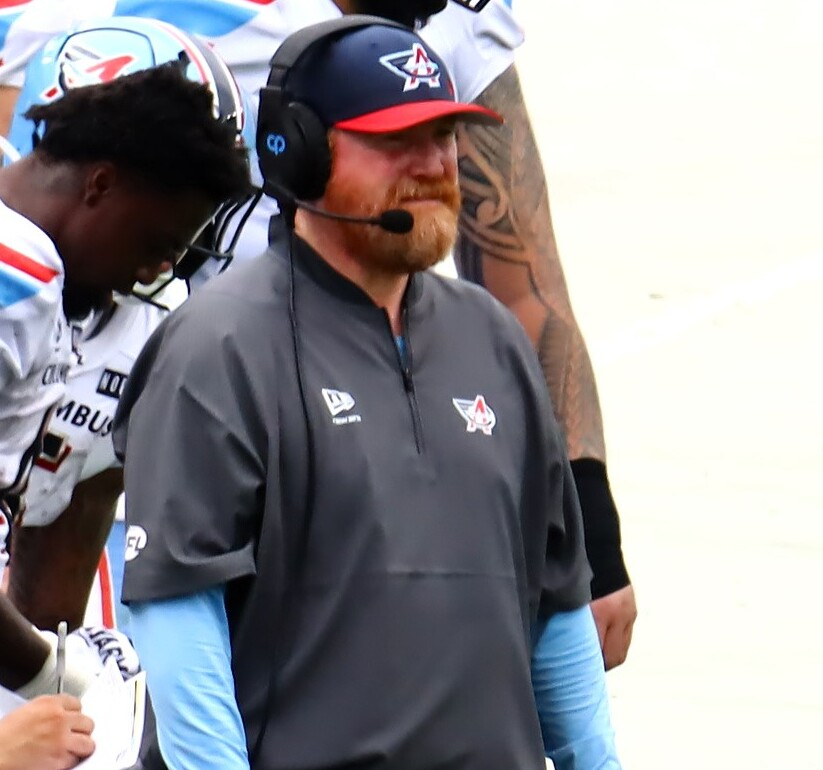
- Saunders in 2026

Columbus Aviators
- Title: Running backs coach/ tight ends coach/ passing game coordinator

Personal information
- Born: November 28, 1976 (age 49); Walnut Creek, California, U.S.

Career information
- College: SMU

Career history
- Kansas City Chiefs (2002–2003) Offensive quality control coach; Kansas City Chiefs (2004–2005) Offensive assistant; Washington Redskins (2006–2007) Assistant wide receivers coach; St. Louis Rams (2008) Assistant wide receivers coach; Washington University Bears (2009–2010) Quarterbacks coach; Virginia Destroyers (2011–2012) Wide receivers coach; Kansas Wesleyan University (2013) Offensive coordinator & quarterbacks coach; Oberlin College (2014) Offensive coordinator & quarterbacks coach; Cleveland Browns (2015) Assistant offensive line coach; Cleveland Browns (2016–2018) Assistant wide receivers coach & offensive quality control coach; DC Defenders (2020) Wide receivers coach; Tampa Bay Bandits (2022) Offensive coordinator; Memphis Showboats (2023) Offensive coordinator & running backs coach; Columbus Aviators (2026–present) Passing game coordinator & running backs coach & tight ends coach

Robert Charles "Bob" Saunders (born November 28, 1976) is an American football coach who is the running backs coach for the Columbus Aviators of the United Football League (UFL). Saunders has served as an Offensive Assistant for the Kansas City Chiefs, Washington Redskins, St. Louis Rams, and Cleveland Browns. He served two seasons as wide receivers coach in the United Football League with the Virginia Destroyers. In college football, he was Offensive Coordinator and quarterbacks coach at Kansas Wesleyan University and at Oberlin College as well as the quarterbacks coach at Washington University in St. Louis. Saunders has been selected as receivers coach for the NFLPA Collegiate Bowl on three occasions. Saunders played collegiate football at Southern Methodist University. He is the son of longtime NFL offensive coordinator and wide receivers coach Al Saunders, whom he worked with in Cleveland. He also served as the wide receivers coach for the DC Defenders of the defunct XFL. Saunders was no longer a part of the Memphis Showboats staff after the XFL and USFL Merger.
