= Keith Mumphery =

American football player (born 1992)

No. 12
- Position: Wide receiver

Personal information
- Born: June 5, 1992 (age 34); Vienna, Georgia, U.S.
- Listed height: 6 ft 0 in (1.83 m)
- Listed weight: 208 lb (94 kg)

Career information
- High school: Dooly County (Vienna)
- College: Michigan State
- NFL draft: 2015: 5th round, 175th overall pick

Career history
- Houston Texans (2015–2016); Dallas Renegades (2020)*; St. Louis BattleHawks (2020); Tampa Bay Bandits (2022)
- * Offseason or practice squad member only

Career NFL statistics
- Receptions: 24
- Receiving yards: 198
- Return yards: 618
- Stats at Pro Football Reference

Keith Mumphery (born June 5, 1992) is an American former professional football player who was a wide receiver in the National Football League (NFL). He was selected by the Houston Texans in the fifth round of the 2015 NFL draft. He played college football for the Michigan State Spartans.

== College career ==
Mumphery committed to play college football at Michigan State University under head coach Mark Dantonio. Throughout his career, he amassed 88 receptions for 1348 yards and 7 touchdowns.

== Professional career ==
=== Houston Texans ===
Mumphery was selected in the fifth round, 175th overall, of the 2015 NFL draft by the Houston Texans. In his rookie year, he played in 13 games, catching 14 passes for 129 yards. Mumphery also handled punt returns and kickoff returns for the Texans, averaging 7.8 return yards per punt and 24.1 return yards per kickoff.

On June 2, 2017, Mumphery was waived by the Texans because of an allegation of sexual misconduct: the prosecutor would not press charges against Mumphery and he was cleared in the first college investigation, but a second college investigation, conducted by Michigan State University (MSU) without effectual notification to Mumphrey, found him guilty of sexual misconduct. The alleged incident occurred after Mumphrey had been graduated from MSU, while he was pursuing graduate studies and an NFL career simultaneously. Because of this, Mumphery was banned from the MSU campus until December 31, 2018. In May 2018, Mumphrey filed a lawsuit against Michigan State, which subsequently settled the case and cleared Mumphrey of any wrongdoing.

=== Dallas Renegades ===
In 2019, Mumphery was picked by the Dallas Renegades of the XFL in the 2020 XFL draft. He was traded to the St. Louis BattleHawks on December 18, 2019. He had his contract terminated when the league suspended operations on April 10, 2020.

=== Tampa Bay Bandits ===
On March 10, 2022, Mumphery was drafted by the Tampa Bay Bandits of the United States Football League (USFL) in the 2022 USFL supplemental draft. After suffering a thigh injury, he was transferred to the team's practice squad before the start of the regular season on April 16, 2022. He remained on the inactive roster on April 22. He was transferred to the active roster on May 6.
