= B. J. Emmons =

American football player (born 1997)

Profile
- Position: Running back

Personal information
- Born: July 3, 1997 (age 29); Morganton, North Carolina, U.S.
- Listed height: 6 ft 0 in (1.83 m)
- Listed weight: 220 lb (100 kg)

Career information
- High school: Freedom (Morganton, North Carolina)
- College: Alabama (2016); Hutchinson CC (2017); Florida Atlantic (2019–2020)
- NFL draft: 2021: undrafted

Career history
- Seattle Seahawks (2021)*; Las Vegas Raiders (2021)*; Seattle Seahawks (2021)*; Jacksonville Jaguars (2021)*; Tampa Bay Bandits (2022); Houston Texans (2022)*; Saskatchewan Roughriders (2022–2023)*; Calgary Stampeders (2024); Caudillos de Chihuahua (2026)
- * Offseason or practice squad member only

Cedric LaBarryon "B.J." Emmons Jr. (born July 3, 1997) is an American professional football running back. He played college football at Florida Atlantic, Hutchinson Community College, and Alabama. Emmons has been a member four different NFL teams; the Seattle Seahawks, Las Vegas Raiders, Jacksonville Jaguars, and Houston Texans. He has played for the Tampa Bay Bandits of the United States Football League (USFL) and the Calgary Stampeders of the Canadian Football League (CFL).

== Early life ==
Emmons attended Freedom High School in Morganton, North Carolina. He rushed for 2,348 yards and 38 touchdowns as a junior. As a senior, he ran for 2,417 yards and 41 touchdowns. Emmons also tallied 123 receiving yards and a touchdown and scored on two punt returns, a kickoff return and an interception return. He was named Northwestern 3A/4A Conference Offensive Player of the Year as well as being selected to the NCPreps.com All-State team, helping the Patriots win their third consecutive conference title.

Emmons was regarded as a four-star prospect ranked No. 94 overall in the 247Sports Composite rankings. He originally committed to Georgia in December 2014, but decommitted on June 11, 2015. On July 20, 2015, Emmons committed to Alabama.

== College career ==
Emmons played seven games for Alabama his true freshman year in 2016, rushing for 173 yards and a touchdown on 35 carries. He suffered a season-ending foot injury roughly halfway through the season. Emmons opted to transfer following the season.

He transferred to Hutchinson Community College and ran for 694 yards and 10 touchdowns on 150 carries in 2017.

Emmons did not play in 2018, and transferred to Florida Atlantic in 2019. He broke his ankle in his first game and was sidelined for the majority of the season before returning for the Conference USA Championship Game and had two touchdowns against UAB. As a junior, Emmons had 51 carries for 237 yards and six touchdowns. He played four games in the COVID-19 2020 season, and had 116 yards and one touchdown.

== Professional career ==
Pre-draft measurables
Height	Weight	Arm length	Hand span	40-yard dash	10-yard split	20-yard split	20-yard shuttle	Three-cone drill	Vertical jump	Broad jump	Bench press
5 ft 11 3/8 in (1.81 m)	215 lb (98 kg)	32 1/4 in (0.82 m)	9 1/4 in (0.23 m)	4.59 s	1.53 s	2.65 s	4.14 s	6.89 s	36.0 in (0.91 m)	10 ft 0 in (3.05 m)	21 reps
All values from Pro Day

=== Seattle Seahawks ===
On May 1, 2021, Emmons was signed by the Seattle Seahawks as an undrafted free agent. He was waived on June 18.

=== Las Vegas Raiders ===
On July 29, 2021, Emmons was signed by the Las Vegas Raiders. He rushed for 90 yards and a touchdown on 24 carries in three preseason games, but did not make the final roster and was signed to the practice squad. Emmons was released on September 6.

=== Seattle Seahawks (second stint) ===
On November 24, 2021, Emmons was signed to the Seattle Seahawks' practice squad. He was waived on November 30.

=== Jacksonville Jaguars ===
On December 7, 2021, Emmons was signed to the Jacksonville Jaguars' practice squad. He was released on January 4, 2022.

=== Tampa Bay Bandits ===
Emmons was selected with the first pick of the 27th round of the 2022 USFL draft by the Tampa Bay Bandits. He was ruled inactive for the team's game against the Michigan Panthers on May 13, 2022. He was moved back to the active roster on May 20.

=== Houston Texans ===
On August 10, 2022, Emmons signed with the Houston Texans. He was waived five days later.

=== Saskatchewan Roughriders ===
On October 2, 2022, Emmons signed with the Saskatchewan Roughriders of the Canadian Football League (CFL). He spent several weeks on the practice roster and did not dress for a regular season game. In January 2023, Emmons and the Riders agreed to a contract extension. On June 4, 2023, Emmons was released by the Roughriders.

=== Calgary Stampeders ===
Emmons signed with the Calgary Stampeders of the CFL on December 11, 2023. He was released on September 27, 2024.

=== Caudillos de Chihuahua ===
Emmons played for the Caudillos de Chihuahua of the Liga de Fútbol Americano Profesional (LFA) in the 2026 LFA season. In week 2, he scored a touchdown in their 27–20 win over their rivals, the Osos de Monterrey.
