= Tampa Bay Bandits (2022) =

Football team in Tampa, Florida

Logo

General information
- Founded: 2021
- Folded: 2022
- Headquartered: Protective Stadium/ Legion Field in Birmingham, Alabama
- Colors: Red, silver, black, white
- Mascot: The Bayside Bandit

Personnel
- Owners: National Spring Football League Enterprises Co, LLC, (Fox Sports)
- Head coach: Todd Haley

Team history
- Tampa Bay Bandits (2022)

Home fields
- Protective Stadium / Legion Field (2022)

League / conference affiliations
- United States Football League (2022): South Division (2022)

The Tampa Bay Bandits were a professional American football team based in Tampa, Florida, The Bandits competed in the United States Football League (USFL) as a member club of the league's South division, prior to going on hiatus after the season. All 2022 USFL regular season games were played at Protective Stadium and Legion Field in Birmingham, Alabama.

== History ==
The Tampa Bay Bandits were one of eight teams that were officially announced as a USFL franchise on The Herd with Colin Cowherd on November 22, 2021.

On January 6, 2022, it was announced on The Herd with Colin Cowherd that former Kansas City Chiefs head coach Todd Haley was named the head coach and general manager for the Bandits.

On November 15, 2022, it was announced that the Tampa Bay Bandits would not play during the 2023 season. This came with the announcement of the creation of the Memphis Showboats. The players and coaches on the existing Bandits team were transferred to the Showboats. In June 2023, league president Daryl Johnston acknowledged that the change was not a "temporary hiatus" as it was portrayed at the time, stating "It was a very difficult decision to move away from Tampa Bay and to bring the franchise here to Memphis, but it was the right decision and if we have an opportunity to go back and engage with Tampa Bay, we can."

== Roster ==
=== Final roster ===
Initially, each team carried a 38-man active roster and a 7-man practice squad, but the rosters were increased to 40 active players and 50 total in May, 2022.

2022 Tampa Bay Bandits roster
Quarterbacks (QB): 10 Jordan Ta'amu; 3 Brady White; Running backs (RB): 28 B. J. Emmons; 27 Tra Minter; 29 Juwan Washington; Wide receivers (WR): 18 Dee Anderson; 81 Rashard Davis; 4 Derrick Dillon; 80 Hasise DuBois; 13 Vinny Papale; 11 Derrick Willies; Tight ends (TE): 88 De'Quan Hampton; 85 Cheyenne O'Grady	Offensive linemen (OL): 72 Jalen Booth T; 73 Juwann Bushell-Beatty T; 64 Fred Lauina G; 51 Damien Mama G; 67 Darrin Paulo T; 75 Dallas Warmack G; Defensive linemen (DL): 99 John Atkins DT; 8 Zac Daew DE; 92 Sulaiman Kamara DT; 94 Daylon Mack DT; 57 Jeff McCulloch DE; 90 Austrian Robinson DT; 55 Michael Scott DE; 98 Jeremiah Valoaga DE	Linebackers (LB): 43 Emmanuel Beal OLB; 50 Anthony Butler; 56 Travis Feeney OLB; 5 T. J. Neal OLB; 41 Greg Reaves OLB; Defensive backs (DB): 21 Delrick Abrams CB; 2 Rashard Causey CB; 22 Anthony Cioffi S; 40 Stephen Griffin S; 24 Jermaine Kelly CB; 42 Antonio Reed S; Special teams (ST): 44 Ryan DiSalvo LS; 16 Brandon Wright K	Practice squad: 70 Matthew Burrell C/G; 7 Christian Campbell CB; 1 John Franklin III WR; 9 Rannell Hall CB; 77 Jarron Jones T; 30 Quenton Meeks CB; 20 Obi Melifonwu S; 25 Keith Mumphery WR; 9 Guy Myers QB; 12 Tyler Rausa K; Reserve: -- Tyler Catalina T (DNR); 65 Corbin Kaufusi T (IR); 61 Bruno Reagan C (IR); -- Eli Rogers WR (DNR); -- Adam Shuler DE (DNR); Rookies in italics 40 active, 5 reserve, 10 practice squad

== Staff ==
2022 Tampa Bay Bandits staff
Front office: General manager – Todd Haley; Head coaches: Head coach – Todd Haley; Offensive coaches: Offensive coordinator - Bob Saunders; Running backs/wide receivers - Yale Van Dyne; Tight ends/special teams - Frank Gansz Jr.; Offensive line - Pat Perles	Defensive coaches: Defensive coordinator/defensive line - Pepper Johnson; Linebackers - Trey Jackson; Defensive backs - Carnell Lake; Defensive assistant - Steven Thompson

== Coach history ==
=== Head coach history ===
#	Name	Term	Regular season				Playoffs			Awards
#	Name	Term	GC	W	L	Win %	GC	W	L	Awards
Tampa Bay Bandits
1	Todd Haley	2022	10	4	6	.400	-	-	-	

=== Offensive coordinator history ===
#	Name	Term	Regular season				Playoffs			Awards
#	Name	Term	GC	W	L	Win %	GC	W	L	Awards
Tampa Bay Bandits
1	Bob Saunders	2022	10	4	6	.400	-	-	-	

=== Defensive coordinator history ===
#	Name	Term	Regular season				Playoffs			Awards
#	Name	Term	GC	W	L	Win %	GC	W	L	Awards
Tampa Bay Bandits
1	Pepper Johnson	2022	10	4	6	.400	-	-	-	

== Records ==
All-time Bandits leaders
Leader	Player	Record	Years with Bandits
Passing yards	Jordan Ta'amu	2,014 passing yards	2022
Passing Touchdowns	Jordan Ta'amu	14 passing touchdowns	2022
Rushing yards	Jordan Ta'amu	365 rushing yards	2022
Rushing Touchdowns	Juwan Washington	3 rushing touchdowns	2022
Receiving yards	Derrick Dillon	386 receiving yards	2022
Receiving Touchdowns	Derrick Dillon	4 receiving touchdowns	2022
Receptions	Cheyenne O'Grady	32 receptions	2022
Tackles	Christian Sam	52 tackles	2022
Sacks	Travis Feeney	4.5 sacks	2022
Interceptions	Anthony Butler	2 interceptions	2022
Coaching wins	Todd Haley	4 wins	2022

== Statistics and records ==
=== Season-by-season record ===
Note: The finish, wins, losses, and ties columns list regular season results and exclude any postseason play.

Legend
USFL champions	Division champions	Wild Card berth

Tampa Bay Bandits season-by-season records
Season	Team	League	Division	Regular season				Postseason results	Awards
Season	Team	League	Division	Finish	Wins	Losses	Ties	Postseason results	Awards
2022	2022	USFL	South	3rd	4	6	0	–	–

=== Rivalries ===
==== Breaker Bay Brawl ====
The Tampa Bay Bandits shared a rivalry with the New Orleans Breakers called the Breaker Bay Brawl. The Bandits finished with a 0–2 record against New Orleans.

==== Franchise matchup history ====
Team	Record	Pct.
Houston Gamblers	2–0	1.000
Michigan Panthers	1–0	1.000
Pittsburgh Maulers	1–0	1.000
New Jersey Generals	0–1	.000
Philadelphia Stars	0–1	.000
Birmingham Stallions	0–2	.000
New Orleans Breakers	0–2	.000
