= Travis Feeney =

American gridiron football player (born 1992)

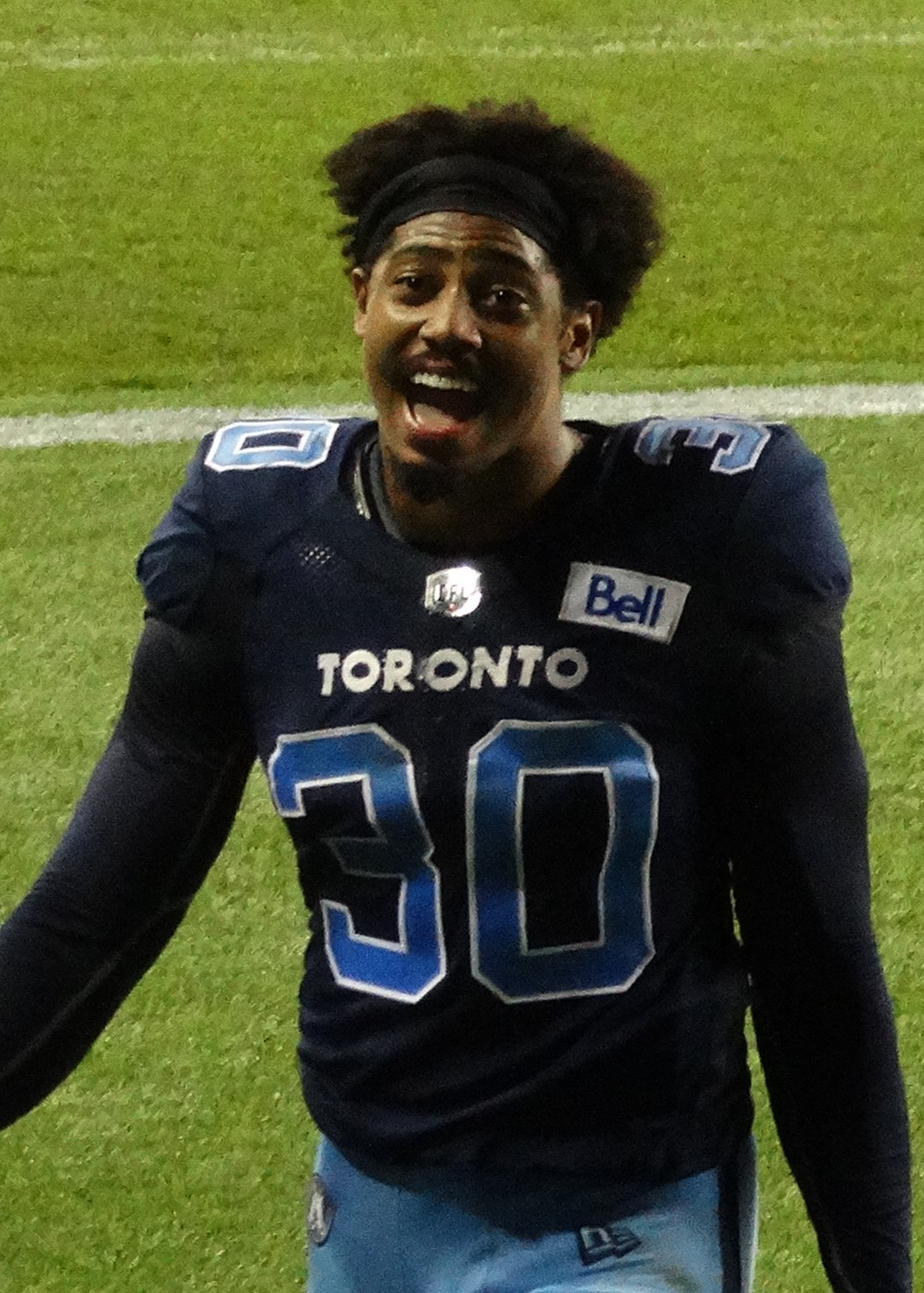
- Feeney with the Toronto Argonauts in 2021

No. 56 – St. Louis Battlehawks
- Position: Linebacker
- Roster status: Active

Personal information
- Born: November 18, 1992 (age 33); Richmond, California, U.S.
- Listed height: 6 ft 4 in (1.93 m)
- Listed weight: 247 lb (112 kg)

Career information
- High school: Pinole Valley (CA)
- College: Washington
- NFL draft: 2016: 6th round, 220th overall pick

Career history
- Pittsburgh Steelers (2016)*; New Orleans Saints (2016); San Diego Fleet (2019); Montreal Alouettes (2019)*; Toronto Argonauts (2020–2021); Tampa Bay Bandits (2022); St. Louis BattleHawks (2023–present)
- * Offseason or practice squad member only

Awards and highlights
- UFL Sportsman of the Year (2025); Second-team All-Pac-12 (2015)
- Stats at Pro Football Reference

Travis Feeney (born November 18, 1992) is an American professional football linebacker for the St. Louis BattleHawks of the United Football League (UFL). He was selected by the Pittsburgh Steelers in the sixth round of the 2016 NFL draft. He played college football for University of Washington. He has also been a member of the New Orleans Saints, San Diego Fleet, Montreal Alouettes, Toronto Argonauts, and Tampa Bay Bandits.

== Professional career ==
Pre-draft measurables
Height	Weight	Arm length	Hand span	Wingspan	40-yard dash	10-yard split	20-yard split	20-yard shuttle	Three-cone drill	Vertical jump	Broad jump
6 ft 3 5/8 in (1.92 m)	230 lb (104 kg)	33 3/8 in (0.85 m)	9 1/2 in (0.24 m)	6 ft 9 5/8 in (2.07 m)	4.50 s	1.59 s	2.64 s	4.42 s	7.20 s	40.0 in (1.02 m)	10 ft 10 in (3.30 m)
All values from NFL Combine

=== Pittsburgh Steelers ===
Feeney was drafted by the Pittsburgh Steelers in the sixth round, 220th overall, in the 2016 NFL draft. On September 3, 2016, he was released by the Steelers as part of final roster cuts and was signed to their practice squad the next day.

=== New Orleans Saints ===
On December 9, 2016, the New Orleans Saints signed Feeney off the Steelers' practice squad.

On June 6, 2017, Feeney was waived by the Saints.

=== San Diego Fleet ===
On October 14, 2018, Feeney signed with the San Diego Fleet of the Alliance of American Football (AAF).

=== Montreal Alouettes ===
Feeney signed with the Montreal Alouettes of the Canadian Football League (CFL) on May 29, 2019, but was released two days later.

=== Toronto Argonauts ===
Feeney signed with the Toronto Argonauts of the CFL on March 31, 2020. After the CFL canceled the 2020 season due to the COVID-19 pandemic, Feeney chose to opt-out of his contract with the Argonauts on August 31, 2020. Feeney was selected by the Jousters of The Spring League during its player selection draft on October 11, 2020. He opted back in to his contract with the Argonauts on February 3, 2021. Feeney spent most of his time on the Argos practice roster and was ultimately released during the off-season after dressing for just 6 games for Toronto.

=== Tampa Bay Bandits ===
Feeney played for the Tampa Bay Bandits of the United States Football League in 2022.

=== St. Louis BattleHawks ===
The St. Louis BattleHawks of the XFL selected Feeney in the second round of the 2023 XFL Supplemental Draft on January 1, 2023. He re-signed with the team on February 2, 2024, and again on October 28, 2024. In week 8 of the 2025 UFL season, Feeney finished the game with 1.5 sacks, 5 tackles, and 2 forced fumbles, one of which was the game-sealing fumble that ended the Birmingham Stallions final drive and secured a Battlehawks victory. Feeney would be awarded the UFL Defensive Player of the Week.
