= 2025 Memphis Showboats season =

American professional football season

- General manager: Jim Monos
- Head coach: Jim Turner (week 1, 4-10); Ken Whisenhunt (week 2-3)
- Home stadium: Simmons Bank Liberty Stadium

Results
- Record: 2–8
- Conference place: 4th in USFL Conference
- Playoffs: Did not qualify

Uniform

The 2025 Memphis Showboats season was the third and final season for the Memphis Showboats as a professional American football franchise and the second season in the United Football League (UFL). The Showboats played their home games at Simmons Bank Liberty Stadium and were led by head coach Ken Whisenhunt and Jim Turner.

Head coach, John DeFilippo resigned along with general manager Dennis Polian on August 10, 2024. Both served one season with the Showboats. The team later appointed Ken Whisenhunt and Jim Monos as Head Coach and General Manager, respectively. Whisenhunt missed Week 1 of the season to attend to a personal matter, during which offensive line coach Jim Turner served as interim head coach. Whisenhunt resigned permanently after week 3, leaving Turner in charge. This had confused Turner, who had initially attempted to keep Whisenhunt's system in place thinking he would return; by the time it became evident that he would be coach the rest of the season, the team was too far out of the playoff hunt to stand a chance, which prompted Turner to use the season for development purposes, particularly rotating all of his quarterbacks.

The Showboats had one of the UFL's worst outcomes in 2025. In addition to the head coaching uncertainties, the team squandered the first overall draft selection it had earned on Jason Bean, who was under contract to the Indianapolis Colts and refused to join the Showboats. The team ultimately failed to win any games in regulation, its only two wins coming in overtime. Offensive line struggles, which had been a major problem in 2024, continued in 2025, with the team eventually resorting to a mass formation of offensive linemen, defensive linemen and tight ends, the "grenade formation," to make any substantial offensive progress by the end of the season. This contributed to the Showboats consistently having the UFL's worst attendance.

== Roster ==
2025 Memphis Showboats final roster
| Quarterbacks: 5 E. J. Perry; 3 Troy Williams; 12 Dresser Winn; Running backs: 29 Jada Byers; 36 Jalen Jackson; 34 Deneric Prince; Wide receivers: 9 Jonathan Adams; 2 Daewood Davis; 83 Isiah Hennie; 18 Kwamie Lassiter II; 1 Kai Locksley; 82 Eli Stove; 86 Isaiah Washington; Tight ends: 87 Thomas Burke; 89 Chris Pierce Jr.; 88 Jay Jay Wilson | Offensive linemen: 62 Dominic Boyd C; 74 Kellen Diesch T; 63 Nate Gilliam T; 69 Noah Henderson T; 66 Nash Jensen G; 72 Alec Lindstrom C; 65 Jared Thomas G; 79 Nick Torres G; 75 James Tunstall T; Defensive linemen: 44 Jaylon Allen DE; 91 Josiah Bronson DT; 90 Dillon Faamatau DT; 50 Izayah Green-May DE; 52 Antwuan Jackson DT; 96 DeVere Levelston DE; 45 Nasir Player DE; 8 Boogie Roberts DT | Linebackers: 42 Steele Chambers; 51 Andrew Dowell; 57 Zeke Vandenburgh; Defensive backs: 6 Lance Boykin CB; 13 Cameron Dantzler CB; 31 Keaton Ellis S; 33 Eric Garror CB; 14 Mark Gilbert CB; 20 Obi Melifonwu S; 10 Amir Riep CB; 26 Ravarius Rivers S; 32 Nehemiah Shelton CB; 7 Eli Walker S; 28 Kyree Woods S; Special teams: 59 Turner Bernard LS; 49 Matt Coghlin K; 19 Matt Mengel P | Reserve lists: 99 John Atkins DT (IR); 50 active, 1 inactive |

== Staff ==
2025 Memphis Showboats staff
| Front office: General manager - Jim Monos; Head coaches: Head coach / Offensive Line - Jim Turner; Offensive coaches: Offensive Coordinator / Quarterbacks - Noel Mazzone; Running Backs - Luke Ferdinand; Wide receivers/Tight ends - T. J. Vernieri | Defensive coaches: Defensive coordinator - Jarren Horton; Defensive line - Brian Baker; Linebackers/Special teams - Marc Hull; Offensive Quality Control - Lee Morris; Defensive Quality Control - Steve Meyer |

== Schedule ==
All times Central

| Week | Day | Date | Kickoff | TV | Opponent | Results | | Location | Attendance |
| Week | Day | Date | Kickoff | TV | Opponent | Score | Record | Location | Attendance |
|---|---|---|---|---|---|---|---|---|---|
| 1 | Sunday | March 30 | 11:00 a.m. | ESPN | Michigan Panthers | L 12–26 | 0–1 | Simmons Bank Liberty Stadium | 4,373 |
| 2 | Saturday | April 5 | 7:00 p.m. | ABC | at DC Defenders | L 12–17 | 0–2 | Audi Field | 13,142 |
| 3 | Saturday | April 12 | 1:30 p.m. | ESPN | Houston Roughnecks | L 17–18 | 0–3 | Simmons Bank Liberty Stadium | 4,753 |
| 4 | Friday | April 18 | 7:00 p.m. | Fox | at Michigan Panthers | L 9–27 | 0–4 | Ford Field | 9,674 |
| 5 | Friday | April 25 | 7:00 p.m. | Fox | at Birmingham Stallions | W 24–20 (OT) | 1–4 | Protective Stadium | 9,127 |
| 6 | Saturday | May 3 | 11:00 a.m. | ABC | at Houston Roughnecks | L 20–21 | 1–5 | Space City Financial Stadium | 4,134 |
| 7 | Sunday | May 11 | 2:00 p.m. | ESPN | St. Louis Battlehawks | L 9–19 | 1–6 | Simmons Bank Liberty Stadium | 4,215 |
| 8 | Friday | May 16 | 7:00 p.m. | Fox | at San Antonio Brahmas | W 24–22 (OT) | 2–6 | Alamodome | 9,244 |
| 9 | Saturday | May 24 | 2:00 p.m. | ESPN3 | Arlington Renegades | L 12–30 | 2–7 | Simmons Bank Liberty Stadium | 2,044 |
| 10 | Sunday | June 1 | 2:00 p.m. | Fox | Birmingham Stallions | L 9–46 | 2–8 | Simmons Bank Liberty Stadium | 4,573 |

== Standings ==
2025 UFL standings
USFL Conference
| Team | W | L | PCT | GB | TD+/- | TD+ | TD- | DIV | PF | PA | DIFF | STK |
|---|---|---|---|---|---|---|---|---|---|---|---|---|
| (y) Birmingham Stallions | 7 | 3 | .700 | – | 8 | 28 | 20 | 5–1 | 244 | 167 | 77 | W2 |
| (x) Michigan Panthers | 6 | 4 | .600 | 1 | 8 | 30 | 22 | 3–3 | 245 | 198 | 47 | L2 |
| (e) Houston Roughnecks | 5 | 5 | .500 | 2 | 0 | 22 | 22 | 3–3 | 183 | 201 | -18 | W2 |
| (e) Memphis Showboats | 2 | 8 | .200 | 5 | -13 | 15 | 28 | 1–5 | 148 | 246 | -98 | L2 |
XFL Conference
| Team | W | L | PCT | GB | TD+/- | TD+ | TD- | DIV | PF | PA | DIFF | STK |
| (y) St. Louis Battlehawks | 8 | 2 | .800 | – | 7 | 26 | 19 | 4–2 | 231 | 163 | 68 | W6 |
| (x) DC Defenders | 6 | 4 | .600 | 2 | 3 | 28 | 25 | 4–2 | 225 | 224 | 1 | L2 |
| (e) Arlington Renegades | 5 | 5 | .500 | 3 | 4 | 23 | 19 | 3–3 | 229 | 168 | 61 | W2 |
| (e) San Antonio Brahmas | 1 | 9 | .100 | 7 | -17 | 14 | 31 | 1–5 | 136 | 274 | -138 | L6 |
(x)–clinched playoff berth; (y)–clinched conference; (e)–eliminated from playoff contention
