= Jarren Horton =

American football coach (born 1991)

Profile
- Position: Defensive coordinator

Personal information
- Born: December 27, 1991 (age 34); Dallas, Texas, U.S.

Career information
- High school: Cascade Christian (WA)
- College: Portland State (2010–2013)

Career history
- Vanderbilt (2015) Defensive analytics assistant; Cleveland Browns (2016) Assistant quality control coach/defensive assistant; Pittsburgh Steelers (2017) Summer assistant; Vanderbilt (2017) Defensive analyst; Southeastern Louisiana (2018) Graduate assistant; Atlanta Legends (2019) Secondary coach/defensive assistant; UConn (2019–2021) Star, nickel and dime coach; UConn (2021) Interim defensive coordinator/safeties coach; Pittsburgh Maulers (2022–2023) Defensive coordinator/assistant head coach; Memphis Showboats (2025) Defensive coordinator

Awards and highlights
- USFL Assistant Coach of the Year (2023)

Jarren Horton (born December 27, 1991) is an American football coach who was the defensive coordinator for the Memphis Showboats of the United Football League (UFL). Horton previously served as the defensive coordinator and assistant head coach for the Pittsburgh Maulers of the United States Football League (USFL). He was named the USFL's Assistant Coach of the Year in 2023.

The son of Ray Horton, he played college football for the Portland State Vikings and has also served as a coach with the Vanderbilt Commodores, Cleveland Browns, Pittsburgh Steelers, Southeastern Louisiana Lions, Atlanta Legends and UConn Huskies.

== Early life and education ==
Horton was born on December 27, 1991, in Dallas, Texas, and is the son of Ray Horton, who formerly played for the Cincinnati Bengals and Dallas Cowboys and later served as a coach. When his father coached with the Pittsburgh Steelers, Jarren Horton served as the team's ball boy. He attended Cascade Christian Schools in Washington and was a three-year letterman in football, helping them to a 47–7 record in four seasons while being a team captain and honorable mention All-League return specialist.

Horton began attending Portland State University in 2010 and redshirted his first season. He played in 2011 but was not on the team the following two years. Horton later graduated from Central Washington University in 2015.

== Coaching career ==
Horton began his coaching career after graduating from Central Washington, serving as a defensive analytics assistant with the Vanderbilt Commodores in 2015. He then served one year as a defensive assistant and assistant quality control coach for the Cleveland Browns in the National Football League (NFL), being under his father who was team's defensive coordinator. In 2017, he served as a summer assistant with the Pittsburgh Steelers before returning to Vanderbilt as a defensive analyst.

Horton was a graduate assistant with the Southeastern Louisiana Lions in 2018. The following spring, he served as the secondary coach and a defensive assistant for the Atlanta Legends of the Alliance of American Football (AAF) prior to the league folding. Afterwards, he was named the coach of the star, nickel and dime cornerbacks for the UConn Huskies. Horton served in those positions through 2021, when he was promoted to interim defensive coordinator and safeties coach at the start of that season after Lou Spanos became interim head coach.

In 2022, Horton was named the defensive coordinator for the Pittsburgh Maulers of the United States Football League (USFL). In his first season with the team, they went 1–9 and placed last in their division. His father, Ray, was named the Maulers' head coach for the 2023 season. Jarren Horton had said that his dream growing up was to be defensive coordinator for the Pittsburgh Steelers with his father as head coach. In his second year, he helped Pittsburgh have the best defense in the league, with them having the lowest total of yards allowed per game (257.4) while having the highest number of takeaways (20). Three Mauler defenders were named to the All-USFL team and they made it to the playoffs for the first time in their history, and for this Horton was named the inaugural winner of the USFL Assistant Coach of the Year Award. On January 1, 2024, it was announced the Maulers would not be a part of the UFL Merger.

On February 2nd, 2025 Horton was announced to be the defensive coordinator for the Memphis Showboats of the United Football League (UFL).
