= Ken Buck (American football) =

American football player (1932–1954)

Profile
- Position: Tight end

Personal information
- Born: March 3, 1932; Pennsylvania, U.S.
- Died: September 23, 1954 (aged 22); Paso Robles, California, U.S.
- Listed height: 6 ft 4 in (1.93 m)
- Listed weight: 199 lb (90 kg)

Career information
- High school: Paso Robles (Paso Robles, CA)
- College: Taft (1950); Pacific (1951–1953)
- NFL draft: 1954: 2nd round, 17th overall pick

Career history
- New York Giants (1954)*
- * Offseason or practice squad member only

Kenneth "Ken" William Buck (March 3, 1932 – September 23, 1954) was an American football tight end. He played college football for the Pacific Tigers and was selected by the New York Giants in the second round (17th overall) of the 1954 NFL draft, but was diagnosed with cancer and died later that year.

Buck was born in Pennsylvania and grew up in Paso Robles, California, where he attended Paso Robles High School. He attended Taft College in 1950 before transferring to the College of the Pacific in 1951, playing three seasons for the Pacific Tigers football team.

Buck broke the Pacific record with 36 receptions during the 1952 season and tied for a national record with 45 catches for 660 yards as a senior in 1953. He was an All-American and was inducted into the College of the Pacific Athletic Hall of Fame in 1984; he still remained fourth in school history by that time with 12 touchdown catches and was top 15 for career receptions (82) and receiving yards (1,124).

Buck was the top draft pick of the New York Giants in the 1954 NFL draft, being chosen in the second round (17th overall). However, he was diagnosed with cancer soon after and his condition worsened, with him dying of the disease on September 23, 1954, at the age of 22.
