= Paso Robles High School =

High school in California, United States

Coordinates: 35°37′00″N 120°40′12″W

Location
- 801 Niblick Road; Paso Robles, (San Luis Obispo County), California 93447; United States

Information
- Type: Public high school
- Principal: Michael Susank (Interim)
- Staff: 92.60 (FTE)
- Enrollment: 2,037 (2023-24)
- Student to teacher ratio: 22.00
- Colors: Crimson and white
- Nickname: Bearcats
- Website: Paso Robles High School

Paso Robles High School (PRHS) is the only comprehensive high school located in the city of Paso Robles, California. The school receives its students from Lewis Flamson Junior High School, located in Paso Robles, as well as from the Lillian Larsen School, a public K-8 school in San Miguel, California, Cappy Culver Elementary and Middle School, a public K-8 school in Lake Nacimiento, California, and Pleasant Valley Elementary School, a public K-8 school located in an outlying area of northeastern San Luis Obispo County. Additionally, the school receives students from private K-8 schools such as Trinity Lutheran School and St. Rose Catholic School, both located in Paso Robles, and some from Santa Lucia School located in Templeton, California

== History ==
The first high school in San Luis Obispo County, Paso Robles High School was built in 1892 and graduated its first senior class in 1896. Constructed with locally made bricks, the stately three-story structure was located at 17th Street and Vine Street, where Marie Bauer Elementary sits now. A decade upon opening, the high school and upper-level auditorium would languish in the aftermath of the San Francisco Earthquake in 1906. A new location was built at 24th and Spring Street, and the faulted building was later razed in 1939. In the 1960s, the 24th Street campus was refurbished, with subsequent additions to what later became Flamson Middle School. (By 2003, the San Simeon Earthquake rendered the structures unsalvageable, and a new middle school was constructed.) By 1980, the third PRHS campus was built on Niblick Road, where it stands today. However, football games continue at War Memorial Stadium on the Flamson Middle School campus to a faithful attendance of PRHS boosters. Most other competitive sporting events are held on the PRHS campus. Although the school's athletic facilities are somewhat limited, the campus plays host to an extensive agricultural education facility. The school's mascot is the bearcat.

Paso Robles High School was ranked #5 in U.S. News & World Report's "Best High Schools in the San Luis Obispo, CA Area".

== Curriculum ==
Paso Robles High School offers vocational, agricultural, and college preparatory programs as well as a limited number of honors and Advanced Placement courses. Foreign languages offered include Spanish and American Sign Language. The school has also maintained the largest SkillsUSA organization in California for several years, and it is an AVID National Demonstration School.

== Extracurricular activities ==
=== Athletics ===
Paso Robles High School was the northernmost high school in the western half of the CIF Southern Section for decades.

In 2016, Paso Robles transferred into the CIF Central Section along with most schools in San Luis Obispo County in a bid to reduce travel expenses and to be more regional. Now playing in the Mountain League as part of the Central Coast Athletic Association, in years past PRHS used to belong to the since-reformed Northern League, Los Padres League and Pac-8 League memberships.

=== Teams ===
- Baseball (men's)
- Basketball
- Cheerleading
- Cross country running
- Football (men's)
- Golf
- Softball (women's)
- Soccer
- Swimming & Diving
- Stunt (women's)
- Tennis
- Track and field
- Volleyball
- Water polo
- Wrestling (men's)

=== Journalism ===
Crimson is a student news magazine of Paso Robles High School. Crimson is the current form of the monthly tabloid newspaper founded in the 1940s named The Crimson Chronicle and originally The Bearcat. Crimson staff members attend national and local journalism conventions and have won recognition in national and statewide competitions for writing, photography, and design. The publication and website are currently advised by Jeff Mount. Many graduates from the program have gone on to careers in journalism, law, communications, and/or design.

== Notable alumni ==
- Bo Bonnheim, Class of 2011, Fresno State offensive lineman
- Jason Botts, Class of 1998, Texas Rangers MLB player
- Ken Buck, Class of 1949, New York Giants 1954 draft choice/Pacific Hall of Fame member
- Derrick Jasper, Class of 2006, Kentucky/UNLV basketball guard
- Bailey Gaither, Class of 2015, selected in the 2022 USFL draft; starting wide receiver for the Pittsburgh Maulers
- Chris Gardner, Class of 1987, Houston Astros pitcher
- Rusty Kuntz, pro baseball player and coach; winner of two World Series
- Frank Minini, Chicago Bears receiver/kick return specialist
- Josh Oliver, Class of 2015, tight end for the Minnesota Vikings; selected in the 2019 NFL draft
- Don Parish, Class of 1966, Stanford Hall of Fame inductee; selected in the 1970 NFL draft; linebacker for the Cardinals/Broncos
- Hamp Pool, Class of 1933, professional football player and college coach
- Mitchell Van Dyk, Class of 2009, offensive lineman for the Pittsburgh Steelers; selected by the St. Louis Rams in the 2014 NFL draft
