= Troy Williams (gridiron football) =

American gridiron football player (born 1994)

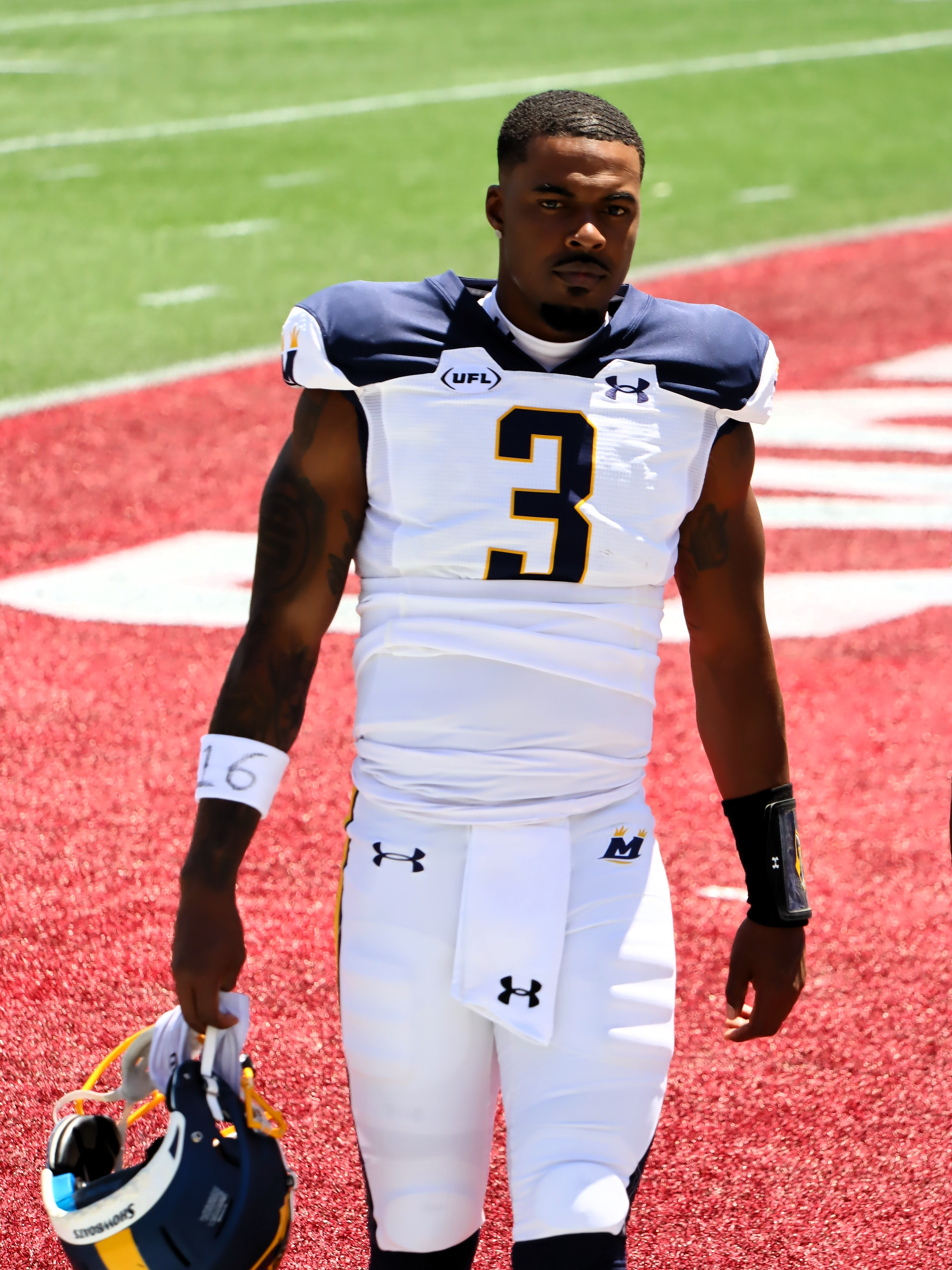
- Williams with the Memphis Showboats in 2025

Profile
- Position: Quarterback

Personal information
- Born: September 11, 1994 (age 32); Carson, California, U.S.
- Listed height: 6 ft 2 in (1.88 m)
- Listed weight: 208 lb (94 kg)

Career information
- High school: Narbonne (Harbor City, California)
- College: Washington (2013–2014); Santa Monica College (2015); Utah (2016–2017)
- NFL draft: 2018: undrafted

Career history
- Edmonton Eskimos / Elks (2019, 2021); Saskatchewan Roughriders (2022)*; Pittsburgh Maulers (2023); Memphis Showboats (2024–2025)
- * Offseason or practice squad member only

Career spring football statistics as of 2025
- Passing attempts: 368
- Passing completions: 225
- Completion percentage: 61.1
- TD–INT: 11–9
- Passing yards: 2,236
- QB rating: 78.1
- Rushing yards: 490
- Rushing touchdowns: 5

Career CFL statistics
- TD–INT: 0–1
- Passing yards: 15
- Comp–Att: 1–3
- Rushing yards: 23
- Stats at CFL.ca

Troy Marc Williams (born September 11, 1994) is an American professional football quarterback. He played college football at Washington and Utah.

== College career ==
Williams began his collegiate career at Washington and redshirted his true freshman season. He played in four games with one start as a redshirt freshman in 2014, completing 23 of 36 passes for 176 yards with two interceptions and rushing for 25 yards and one touchdown on 16 carries. After the season Williams announced he would be leaving the program.

He ultimately enrolled at Santa Monica College. In his lone season at Santa Monica he led the Corsairs to an 11–0 record while throwing for 2,750 yards with 31 touchdowns and four interceptions and rushing for seven touchdowns. During the football season Williams committed to transfer to Utah at the end of his fall semester.

Williams was named the Utes starting quarterback going into his first season with the team. He passed for 2,757 yards with 15 touchdowns and eight interceptions while also rushing for 235 yards and five touchdowns as the Utes went 9–4. Going into his redshirt senior year Williams lost his starting quarterback job to Tyler Huntley in training camp. He played in eight games and started three games when Huntley was unavailable due to injury in his final collegiate season, passing for 812 yards with four touchdowns and two interceptions and also rushing for four touchdowns.

== Professional career ==
After going unselected in the 2018 NFL draft, Williams participated in rookie minicamps Seattle Seahawks and the Los Angeles Chargers on a tryout basis was not signed by either team. He was invited to another tryout by the Seahawks in 2019 but was not signed.

=== Edmonton Eskimos ===
Williams was signed by the Edmonton Eskimos of the Canadian Football League on June 2, 2019. He spent most of the season on the Eskimos' practice roster but was elevated to the active roster prior to week 18. Williams played in two games during the 2019 season, completing one of three passes for 15 yards with an interception and rushing for 26 yards.

After the CFL canceled the 2020 season due to the COVID-19 pandemic, Williams chose to opt-out of his contract with the Eskimos on August 31, 2020. He signed a contract extension through the 2022 season on January 15, 2021. Williams was released on August 10, 2021.

=== Saskatchewan Roughriders ===
Williams was signed by the Saskatchewan Roughriders on May 10, 2022. Williams was released by the Roughriders on June 3, 2022.

=== Pittsburgh Maulers ===
Williams signed with the Pittsburgh Maulers of the United States Football League on September 26, 2022. The Maulers folded when the XFL and USFL merged to create the United Football League (UFL).

=== Memphis Showboats ===
Williams was signed by the Memphis Showboats of the United Football League (UFL) on January 29, 2024. He re-signed with the team on August 27.

== Career statistics ==
=== CFL ===
Year	Team	Games			Passing									Rushing				
Year	Team	GP	GS	Record	Cmp	Att	Pct	Yds	Y/A	Lng	TD	Int	Rtg	Att	Yds	Avg	Lng	TD
2019	EDM	2	0	—	1	3	33.3	15	5.0	15	0	0	11.1	11	26	2.4	4	0
Career		2	0	—	1	3	33.3	15	5.0	15	0	0	11.1	11	26	2.4	4	0

=== USFL/UFL ===
==== Regular season ====
Year	Team	League	Games			Passing									Rushing				
Year	Team	League	GP	GS	Record	Cmp	Att	Pct	Yds	Y/A	Lng	TD	Int	Rtg	Att	Yds	Avg	Lng	TD
2023	PIT	USFL	10	8	4–4	143	220	65.0	1,414	6.4	34	6	3	86.4	60	341	5.7	34	3
2024	MEM	UFL	8	3	0–3	58	106	54.7	592	5.6	82	5	5	67.0	12	74	6.2	15	1
2025	MEM	UFL	5	2	1–1	24	42	57.1	230	5.5	38	0	1	62.6	13	75	5.8	13	1
Career			23	13	5–8	225	368	61.1	2,236	6.1	82	11	9	78.1	85	490	5.8	34	5

==== Postseason ====
Year	Team	League	Games			Passing									Rushing				
Year	Team	League	GP	GS	Record	Cmp	Att	Pct	Yds	Y/A	Lng	TD	Int	Rtg	Att	Yds	Avg	Lng	TD
2023	PIT	USFL	1	1	1–1	23	38	60.5	370	9.7	72	2	1	99.7	7	22	3.1	6	1
Career			2	2	1–1	47	77	61.0	346	4.5	41	1	0	76.0	10	74	7.4	19	0

=== College ===
Season	Team	Games			Passing								Rushing			
Season	Team	GP	GS	Record	Cmp	Att	Pct	Yds	Y/A	TD	Int	Rtg	Att	Yds	Avg	TD
2013	Washington	0	0	—	Redshirt											
2014	Washington	5	1	0–1	23	36	63.9	176	4.9	0	2	93.8	16	25	1.6	1
2015	Santa Monica	10	10	10–0	180	265	67.9	2,750	10.4	31	4	190.7	45	139	3.1	7
2016	Utah	13	13	9–4	207	390	53.1	2,757	7.1	15	8	121.0	111	235	2.1	5
2017	Utah	8	3	1–2	60	110	54.5	812	7.4	2	4	115.3	167	335	1.9	4
Division I FBS career		26	17	10–7	290	536	54.1	3,745	7.0	17	14	118.0	167	335	2.0	10
Junior college career		10	10	10–0	180	265	67.9	2,750	10.4	31	4	190.7	45	139	3.1	7
