= Kirby Wilson =

American football player and coach (born 1961)

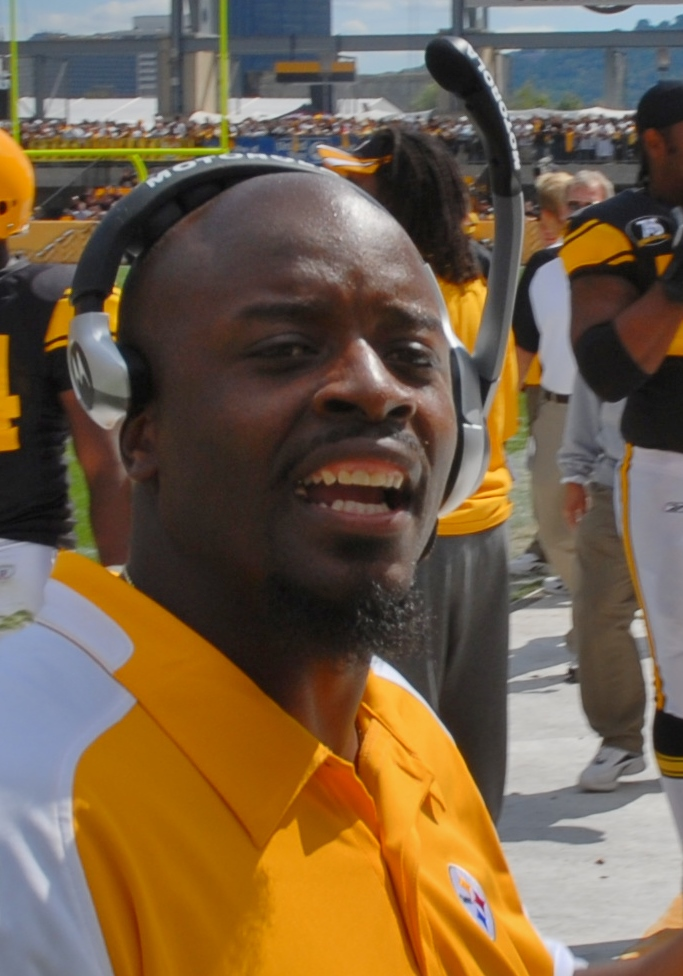
- Wilson with the Pittsburgh Steelers in 2007

Personal information
- Born: August 24, 1961 (age 65); Los Angeles, California, U.S.

Career information
- High school: Susan Miller Dorsey (Los Angeles, California)
- College: Illinois

Career history

Playing
- Winnipeg Blue Bombers (1983); Toronto Argonauts (1984)

Coaching
- Pasadena City (1985) Wide receivers coach; Los Angeles Southwest (1989–1990) Wide receivers and quarterbacks coach; Southern Illinois (1991) Linebackers coach; Southern Illinois (1992) Defensive coordinator; Wyoming (1993–1994) Defensive coordinator; Iowa State (1995–1996) Running backs coach; New England Patriots (1997–1999) Running backs coach; Washington Redskins (2000) Running backs coach; USC (2001) Wide receivers coach; Tampa Bay Buccaneers (2002–2003) Running backs coach; Arizona Cardinals (2004–2006) Running backs coach; Pittsburgh Steelers (2007–2013) Running backs coach; Minnesota Vikings (2014–2015) Running backs coach; Cleveland Browns (2016–2017) Running backs coach; Arizona Cardinals (2018) Running backs coach; Oakland / Las Vegas Raiders (2019–2020) Running backs coach; Pittsburgh Maulers (2022) Head coach

Awards and highlights
- 2× Super Bowl champion (XXXVII, XLIII); WAC co-champion (1993)

Head coaching record
- Career: 1–9 (.100)

Kirby Keyes Wilson (born August 24, 1961) is an American football coach who was previously a running backs coach in the National Football League (NFL) for 23 seasons. He coached for the New England Patriots, Washington Redskins, Tampa Bay Buccaneers, Pittsburgh Steelers, Minnesota Vikings, Cleveland Browns, Arizona Cardinals and Oakland / Las Vegas Raiders. He was previously the head coach for the Pittsburgh Maulers of the United States Football League (USFL).

== Playing career ==
=== High school ===
Wilson prepped at Dorsey High School in Los Angeles.

=== College ===
Wilson played at the University of Illinois after transferring from Pasadena City College.

He obtained a Bachelor of Arts degree from Eastern Illinois University in 1989.

=== Canadian Football League ===
Wilson played two seasons in the Canadian Football League as a defensive back and kick returner for the Winnipeg Blue Bombers and Toronto Argonauts between 1983 and 1984.

== Coaching career ==
=== College ===
At the college level, Wilson has coached at Pasadena City College, Los Angeles Southwest College, Southern Illinois, Wyoming, USC and Iowa State. Kirby is a member of Iota Phi Theta fraternity.

Before moving to the NFL, he coached Iowa State running back Troy Davis to a year where he ran for over 2,000 yards in 1995 and over 2,100 yards in 1996.

=== New England Patriots ===
In 1997, Wilson was hired by the New England Patriots as their running backs coach.

=== Washington Redskins ===
In 2000, Wilson was hired by the Washington Redskins as their running backs coach.

=== Tampa Bay Buccaneers ===
In 2002, Wilson was hired by the Tampa Bay Buccaneers as their running backs coach.

=== Arizona Cardinals ===
In 2004, Wilson was hired by the Arizona Cardinals as their running backs coach.

=== Pittsburgh Steelers ===
In January 2007, Wilson was hired by the Pittsburgh Steelers as their running backs coach, after the retirement of Dick Hoak. He was hired when Mike Tomlin took over the team, following Bill Cowher's resignation.

=== Minnesota Vikings ===
In 2014, Wilson was hired by the Minnesota Vikings as their running backs coach.

=== Cleveland Browns ===
In 2016, Wilson was hired by the Cleveland Browns as their running backs coach.

=== Return to Arizona ===
On February 14, 2018, Wilson returned to the Arizona Cardinals after they hired him as their running backs coach.

=== Oakland / Las Vegas Raiders ===
On February 15, 2019, Wilson was hired by the Oakland Raiders as their running backs coach.

On July 16, 2021, Wilson announced his retirement.

=== Pittsburgh Maulers ===
On January 20, 2022, Wilson was named Head coach of the Pittsburgh Maulers of the United States Football League (USFL).

Wilson cut running back De'Veon Smith for asking for pizza instead of chicken salad in the cafeteria. The absurdity of the situation led to Wilson being heavily criticized .

== Head coaching record ==
Team	Year	Regular season					Postseason			
Team	Year	Won	Lost	Ties	Win %	Finish	Won	Lost	Win %	Result
PIT	2022	1	9	0	.100	4th (North Division)	—	—	—	—
Total		10	0	0	.100		—	—	—	—
