= Mitchell Van Dyk =

American football player (born 1991)

No. 65
- Position: Offensive line

Personal information
- Born: January 2, 1991 (age 35); Paso Robles, California, U.S.
- Listed height: 6 ft 8 in (2.03 m)
- Listed weight: 325 lb (147 kg)

Career information
- High school: Paso Robles
- College: Portland State
- NFL draft: 2014: 7th round, 226th overall pick

Career history
- St. Louis Rams (2014)*; Pittsburgh Steelers (2015); Indianapolis Colts (2016)*; San Francisco 49ers (2016)*; Calgary Stampeders (2016)*; BC Lions (2017)*
- * Offseason or practice squad member only

Awards and highlights
- Third-team FCS All-American (2013); First-team All-Big Sky (2013); 2× Portland State Most Outstanding Offensive Lineman (2012, 2013)
- Stats at Pro Football Reference

Mitchell Van Dyk (born June 18, 1991) is an American former professional football player who was an offensive tackle and guard. He played college football for the Portland State Vikings and was selected by the St. Louis Rams in the seventh round (with the 226th overall pick) of the 2014 NFL draft.

== Early life ==
As a senior for Paso Robles High School, Van Dyk was converted from tight end to offensive tackle.

== College career ==
Mitchell Van Dyk attended Portland State University. Van Dyk played in a total of 36 games and started 33 of them.

Van Dyk earned the starting spot at right tackle in 2011, and went on to twice win the Vikings' Offensive Lineman of the Year accolade. Following the 2013 season, he was selected as a third-team AP All-American honoree and was invited to the College All-Star Bowl hosted by Furman.

== Professional career ==
=== St. Louis Rams ===
Van Dyk was selected by the St. Louis Rams in the seventh round of the 2014 NFL draft with the 226th overall pick. He was released by the Rams on August 30, 2014 after the preseason.

=== Pittsburgh Steelers ===
Van Dyk signed a reserve/future contract with the Pittsburgh Steelers on January 15, 2015. Van Dyk spent the entire 2015 season on the Steelers' injured reserve list after being waived-injured by the team on September 5, 2015.

=== Indianapolis Colts ===
On April 20, 2016, Van Dyk signed with the Indianapolis Colts. He was waived on May 2. On June 6, 2016, Van Dyk was re-signed to the Colts roster. On September 3, 2016, he was waived by the Colts as part of final roster cuts heading into the regular season.

=== San Francisco 49ers ===
On December 13, 2016, Van Dyk was signed to the San Francisco 49ers' practice squad.

=== Calgary Stampeders ===
Van Dyk was signed to the practice roster of the Calgary Stampeders on November 10, 2016.

He participated in The Spring League in 2017.

=== BC Lions ===
Van Dyk was signed to the practice roster of the BC Lions on September 12, 2017.
