= Bailey Gaither =

American football player (born 1997)

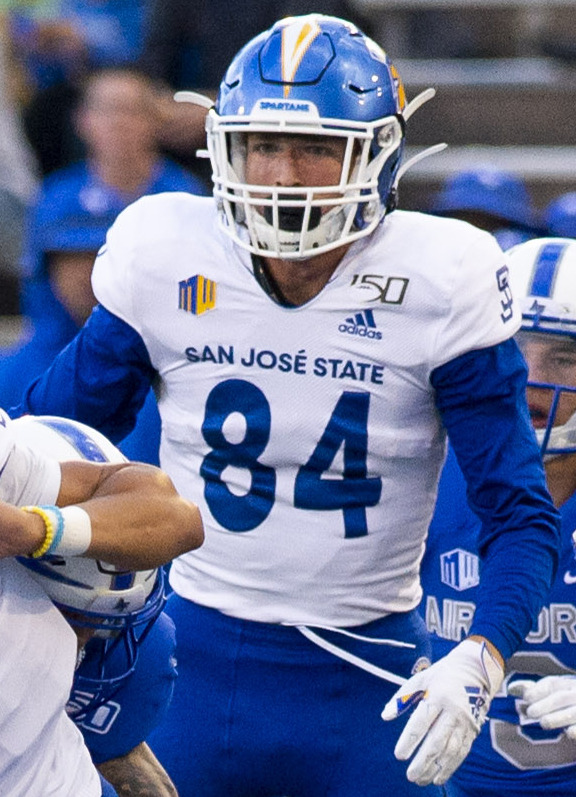
- Gaither with San Jose State in 2019

No. 84
- Position: Wide receiver

Personal information
- Born: January 11, 1997 (age 29); Paso Robles, California, U.S.
- Listed height: 6 ft 0 in (1.83 m)
- Listed weight: 188 lb (85 kg)

Career information
- High school: Paso Robles
- College: San Jose State
- NFL draft: 2021: undrafted

Career history
- Green Bay Packers (2021)*; Pittsburgh Maulers (2022); Baltimore Ravens (2022)*; New York Giants (2022)*; Baltimore Ravens (2022)*; Pittsburgh Maulers (2023); Houston Roughnecks (2025)*
- * Offseason or practice squad member only

Awards and highlights
- All-Mountain West Conference First Team (2020)
- Stats at Pro Football Reference

Bailey Gaither (born January 11, 1997) is an American former football wide receiver. He played college football at San Jose State.

== Early life ==
Gaither attended Paso Robles High School as a two-sport athlete, also excelling in baseball.

As a senior for the Bearcats, Gaither caught 73 passes for 1,480 yards, returned 16 kickoffs for a 44.6-yard per-return average, and scored 30 total touchdowns on the season, as PRHS won the CIF Southern Section Northern Division championship.

Gaither, who scored 56 combined touchdowns in his prep career, was evaluated as a three-star prospect by the 247 Sports Network, which ranked him among the top 150 overall players in the state.

He was also a high school teammate of fellow future pro Josh Oliver.

== College career ==
After graduating high school, Gaither enrolled at San Jose State, where in his first year he redshirted.

Gaither had arguably his best college season in 2019. He started all 12 games and caught 52 passes for 812 yards and 6 touchdowns (in six consecutive games, setting a program record). He also recorded 1 punt return for 10 yards and had a blocked punt that was featured on ESPN SportsCenter's Top 10 "Plays of the Day" for October 26.

In his final college season, Gaither earned first-team All-Mountain West Conference selection and graduated with his bachelor's degree in communication studies. He started 7 of 7 games as a captain for the Spartans, and caught 41 passes for 725 yards and 4 touchdowns. He also had 5 punt returns for 37 yards.

During the 2020 season, he helped SJSU earn its first AP Top 25 Poll ranking in eight years, as the Spartans peaked at No. 19 before finishing 24th in the final poll.

Collegiate Receiving Statistics
	Team	Rec.	Yds.	Avg.	LG	TD
Career	SJSU	135	2,227	16.5	80t	18

Collegiate Rushing Statistics
	Team	Att.	Yds.	Avg.	LG	TD
Career	SJSU	4	30	7.5	21	0

== Professional career ==
Pre-draft measurables
Height	Weight	Arm length	Hand span	40-yard dash	10-yard split	20-yard split	20-yard shuttle	Three-cone drill	Vertical jump	Broad jump	Bench press
6 ft 0 in (1.83 m)	188 lb (85 kg)	31 in (0.79 m)	9 1/4 in (0.23 m)	4.48 s	1.57 s	2.62 s	4.39 s	7.07 s	31 in (0.79 m)	10 ft 0 in (3.05 m)	9 reps
All values from NFL Combine/Pro Day

=== Green Bay Packers and initial retirement ===
On May 3, 2021, Gaither signed with the Green Bay Packers as an undrafted free agent, shortly after the conclusion of the 2021 NFL draft. On August 3, 2021, he retired from the NFL and was placed on reserve/retired list. On August 20, 2021, he was waived from the retired list.

=== Pittsburgh Maulers (first stint) ===
On February 23, 2022, Gaither came out of retirement and was selected in the 14th round of the 2022 USFL draft by the Pittsburgh Maulers, reuniting him with his former college teammate, Josh Love. On May 6, 2022, Gaither was transferred to the team's inactive roster while he dealt with an undisclosed illness. On May 14, 2022, Gaither was moved back to the active roster.

=== Baltimore Ravens (first stint) ===
On July 27, 2022, Gaither signed with the Baltimore Ravens. He was waived on August 23.

Preseason NFL Statistics
Preseason	Team	Rec.	Yds.	Avg.	LG	TD	Tgts.
2022	BAL	2	18	9.0	10	0	3

=== New York Giants ===
On August 24, 2022, Gaither was claimed off waivers by the New York Giants. He was waived the next day after failing his team physical.

=== Baltimore Ravens (second stint) ===
On October 5, 2022, Gaither re-signed with the Ravens, this time joining their practice squad. On October 10, 2022, Gaither was released by the Ravens.

=== Pittsburgh Maulers (second stint) ===
On January 24, 2023, Gaither re-signed with the Maulers. The team later folded when the XFL and USFL merged to create the second iteration of the United Football League (UFL), leaving Gaither as a free agent.

=== Houston Roughnecks ===
On July 23, 2024, Gaither signed a letter of intent with the Houston Roughnecks. He was waived just over a month later, on August 19, 2024.

=== BC Lions ===
On March 6, 2025, Gaither signed with the BC Lions of the Canadian Football League (CFL). He was released on May 11, 2025.

== Professional statistics (regular season) ==
USFL Statistics
Season	Team	GP	GS	Rec.	Yds.	Avg.	LG	TD	Rush. Att.	Rush. Yds.	LG	Avg.	TD	KR	KR Yds.
2022	PIT	7	2	24	328	13.7	37	4	0	0	–	–	0	0	0
2023	PIT	9	7	35	370	10.6	43	1	8	39	14	4.9	1	0	34
Totals		16	9	59	698	11.8	43	5	8	39	14	4.9	1	0	34
