= Jason Botts =

American baseball player (born 1980)

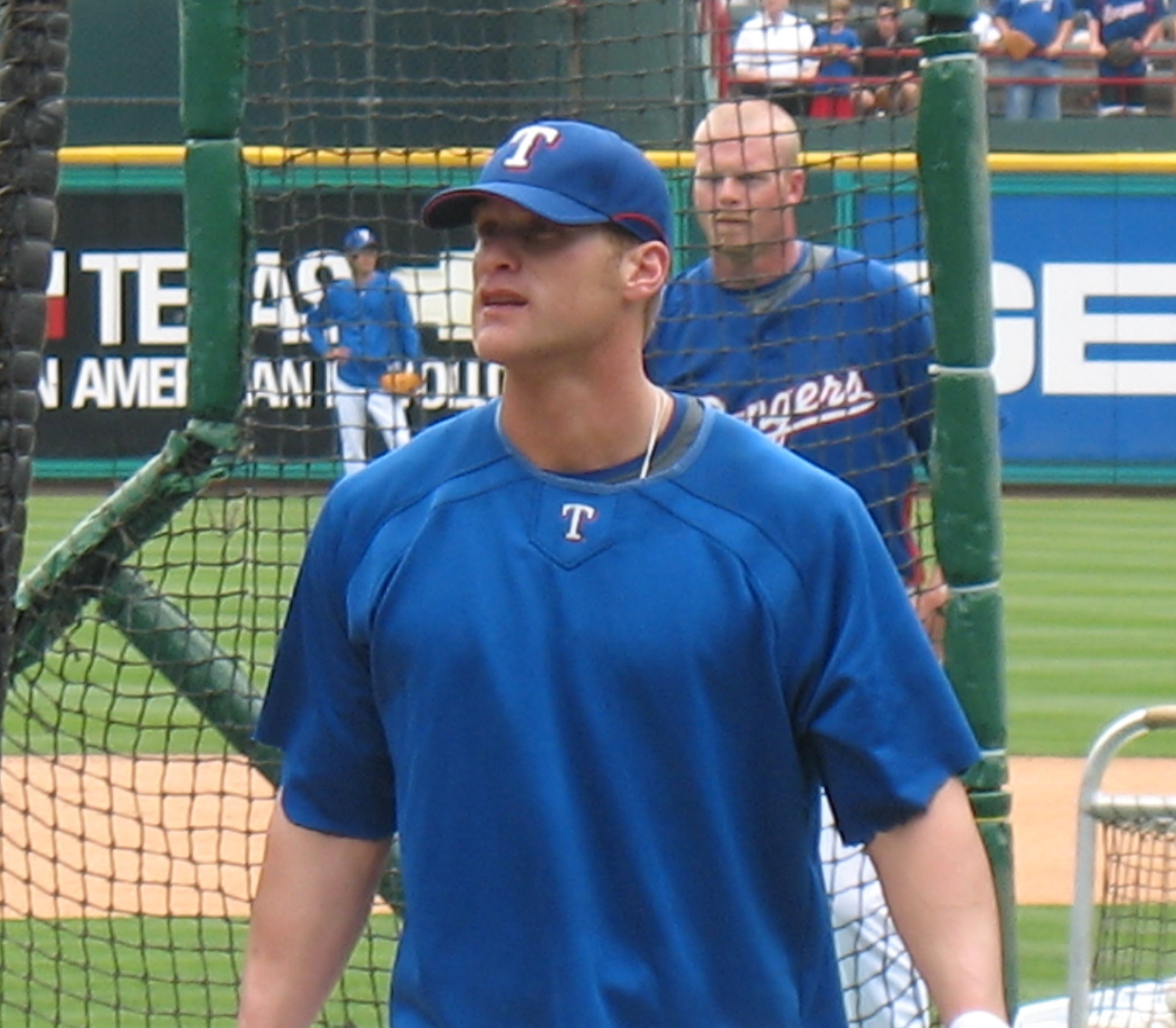
- Botts with the Texas Rangers in 2008
- Left fielder / Designated hitter
- Born: July 26, 1980 (age 45); Paso Robles, California, U.S.
- Batted: Switch Threw: Right

Professional debut
- MLB: September 14, 2005, for the Texas Rangers
- NPB: July 8, 2008, for the Hokkaido Nippon Ham Fighters

Last appearance
- MLB: April 27, 2008, for the Texas Rangers
- NPB: October 10, 2009, for the Hokkaido Nippon Ham Fighters

MLB statistics
- Batting average: .230
- Home runs: 5
- Runs batted in: 28

NPB statistics
- Batting average: .252
- Home runs: 6
- Runs batted in: 22
- Stats at Baseball Reference

Teams
- Texas Rangers (2005–2008); Hokkaido Nippon Ham Fighters (2008–2009)

Jason Carl Botts (born July 26, 1980) is an American former professional baseball left fielder, designated hitter and first baseman. He played in Major League Baseball (MLB) for the Texas Rangers, and in Nippon Professional Baseball (NPB) for the Hokkaido Nippon Ham Fighters.

== Early life ==
As a senior for Paso Robles High School in 1998, Botts had a .413 batting average and went 9-2 as a pitcher with a 2.13 earned-run average, winning San Luis Obispo County Player of the Year honors from the San Luis Obispo Tribune.

He was drafted in the 28th round by Baltimore out of high school before going on to play for Glendale College.

== Professional baseball career ==
=== Texas Rangers ===
Botts was called-up after hitting .326 against left-handed pitching while with Oklahoma at the Triple-A level. He made his major league debut for the Texas Rangers on September 14, 2005, against the Baltimore Orioles, and had a total of 27 at-bats in that month. His fortunes at the plate were somewhat mixed: he produced 8 hits and 3 RBI, but also struck out 13 times.

On May 28, 2006, Botts started as the DH against the Oakland Athletics. He hit his first major league home run into the upper deck at Rangers Ballpark in Arlington against A's righthander Kirk Saarloos in the 2nd inning. On August 1, 2007, Botts was called up again by the Texas Rangers to be the designated hitter for the remainder of the 2007 season. Through his first eight games, he had a .219 batting average with one home run and four RBI.

On April 29, 2008, the Rangers designated Botts for assignment, giving them 10 days to trade, release, or outright him to the minors. On May 7, 2008, the Rangers outrighted Botts to Triple-A Oklahoma.

=== Hokkaido Nippon Ham Fighters ===
On June 4, 2008, the Hokkaido Nippon Ham Fighters in Japan's Pacific League acquired him from the Texas Rangers. After the season, he also played in the Mexican Pacific League for the Yaquis de Obregón, Tomateros de Culiacán and most recently for Cañeros de Los Mochis.

=== Chicago White Sox ===
Botts was signed to a minor league contract on December 17, 2009, by the Chicago White Sox. Botts was released on March 17, 2010.

=== Camden River Sharks ===
Botts started the 2010 season with the Camden River Sharks of the Atlantic League.

=== Washington Nationals ===
On June 9, 2010, he was signed to a minor league contract by the Washington Nationals.

=== Colorado Rockies ===
On March 26, 2011, Botts signed a minor league contract with the Colorado Rockies. He was released on April 7.

=== New York Mets ===
Botts signed with the York Revolution of the Atlantic League for 2011. However, on May 19, he signed a minor league contract with the New York Mets.

=== Grand Prairie AirHogs ===
Botts signed with the Grand Prairie AirHogs of the American Association of Independent Professional Baseball and played for them during the 2014 season.

== Personal ==
While two more PRHS grads have also reached the MLB level, Botts is one of two major leaguers to have been born in Paso Robles, California, with the other native of the city being Hal Rhyne.
