= Derrick Jasper =

American basketball player (born 1988)

Personal information
- Born: April 13, 1988 (age 38) San Leandro, California, U.S.
- Listed height: 6 ft 6 in (1.98 m)
- Listed weight: 213 lb (97 kg)

Career information
- High school: Paso Robles (Paso Robles, California)
- College: Kentucky (2006–2008); UNLV (2009–2011)
- NBA draft: 2011: undrafted
- Position: Point guard
- Number: 5

Career highlights
- SEC All-Freshman Team (2007)

Derrick Lamar Jasper (born April 13, 1988) is an American former basketball player from San Luis Obispo, California. He was listed as a point guard, but was considered versatile enough to also play the shooting guard and small forward positions. Jasper was selected to the SEC All-Freshman Team in 2007.

== Early life ==
Jasper was ranked in the top 40 in many national recruiting rankings and was a consensus 4-star prospect. He was also the third-ranked point guard in the class of 2006 by Rivals.com, in addition to being ranked as the 25th overall recruit, in early 2005.

One of his top honors in AAU basketball was winning the MVP award at the Adidas Super 64 Tournament. Jasper played in summers for the Elite Basketball Organization (EBO) club, as he was teammates with Brook Lopez, Robin Lopez, and Quincy Pondexter. He attended Paso Robles High School, and was selected to the Cal-Hi Sports all-state team after leading the Bearcats to the CIF Southern Section Division 2A playoff semifinals.

After receiving offers from schools such as Memphis, Washington, and Illinois, he decided to play at the University of Kentucky, verbally committing in September 2005 and joining Jodie Meeks, Perry Stevenson and Michael Porter in comprising the Wildcats' 2006 recruiting class when he signed his National Letter of Intent in November.

== College career ==
=== Kentucky ===
As a freshman, Jasper was chosen to start as coach Tubby Smith's point guard. He ultimately started the final 27 games of the 2006–07 season. UK won its first 11 games with Jasper as a starter.

Over the summer, he had microfracture surgery performed on his left knee and missed the first 10 games of the 2007–08 season. When he returned to action, he was the Wildcats' sixth man until freshman star Patrick Patterson would sit the rest of the season with a stress fracture in his ankle. After Patterson's injury, Jasper would take his place in the lineup. His final game with Kentucky would be played in the first round of the 2008 NCAA Tournament vs. the Marquette Golden Eagles.

Jasper earned SEC Academic Honor Roll status in 2008.

=== UNLV ===
In May 2008, rumors circulated that Jasper was transferring from Kentucky to a school closer to his Paso Robles, California home. The schools that were named as his possible destinations were UNLV, California and UCLA. This proved to be true when he asked for his release from the team in June. Jasper said, "My transfer is no indication of my experience here; I like the direction they're headed in - it's just that I would like to attend a place closer to my home."

Jasper transferred to UNLV to play for head coach Lon Kruger. He said he liked how he fit in with the team and how Kruger motivated his players. He sat out the 2008–09 season because of NCAA transfer rules.

In October 2009, Jasper was selected as the Preseason Mountain West Conference Newcomer of the Year. He then started at guard for the Runnin' Rebels, and notably led the team to wins against 16th-ranked Louisville and No. 15 New Mexico, and earned his first double-double in college in a win over Tulsa at the 76 Classic in Anaheim. Jasper sustained a sprained MCL to his left knee in 2010, however, sidelining him for five weeks.
