= Josh Oliver =

American football player (born 1997)

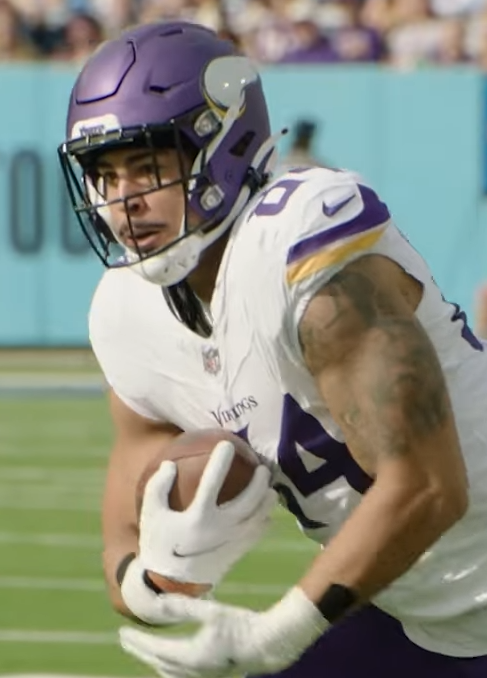
- Oliver with the Minnesota Vikings in 2024

No. 84 – Minnesota Vikings
- Position: Tight end
- Roster status: Injured reserve

Personal information
- Born: March 21, 1997 (age 29); Templeton, California, U.S.
- Listed height: 6 ft 5 in (1.96 m)
- Listed weight: 264 lb (120 kg)

Career information
- High school: Paso Robles (Paso Robles, California)
- College: San Jose State (2015–2018)
- NFL draft: 2019: 3rd round, 69th overall pick

Career history
- Jacksonville Jaguars (2019–2020); Baltimore Ravens (2021–2022); Minnesota Vikings (2023–present)

Awards and highlights
- First-team All-MWC (2018)

Career NFL statistics as of Week 2, 2026
- Receptions: 88
- Receiving yards: 907
- Receiving touchdowns: 11
- Stats at Pro Football Reference

Josh Oliver (born March 21, 1997) is an American professional football tight end for the Minnesota Vikings of the National Football League (NFL). He played college football for the San Jose State Spartans.

== Early life ==
Born in Templeton, California, Oliver attended Paso Robles High School in Paso Robles, California.

His uncle, Clancy Oliver, was an NFL defensive back for the Pittsburgh Steelers from 1969 to 1970 and then-St. Louis Cardinals in 1973, and second cousin Darren Oliver was a Major League Baseball pitcher from 1993 to 2013, while his father Rene Oliver earned All-Western Football Conference first-team accolades as a cornerback at Cal Poly in 1987 and 1988.

Josh Oliver played tight end, defensive end, and outside linebacker on the football team and forward on the basketball team in high school, earning first-team all-county accolades from the San Luis Obispo Tribune in both sports.

During the 2014 season, Oliver compiled 453 receiving yards and seven touchdown catches in helping PRHS advance to the CIF Southern California Division III championship game.

He was a high school and college teammate of Bailey Gaither, future United States Football League wide receiver and return specialist.

Meanwhile, for his play at linebacker, Oliver was selected as the 2014 CIF Southern Section Northern Division Defensive Player of the Year in January 2015. He accumulated 13 sacks and two interceptions (returned for 28 yards) as a senior.

== College career ==
Initially listed as an "athlete" in much of the recruiting process, Oliver was announced as a tight end upon signing a National Letter of Intent with San Jose State, as then-positional coach Dan Ferrigno commented he "[had] the tools to become an elite tight end."

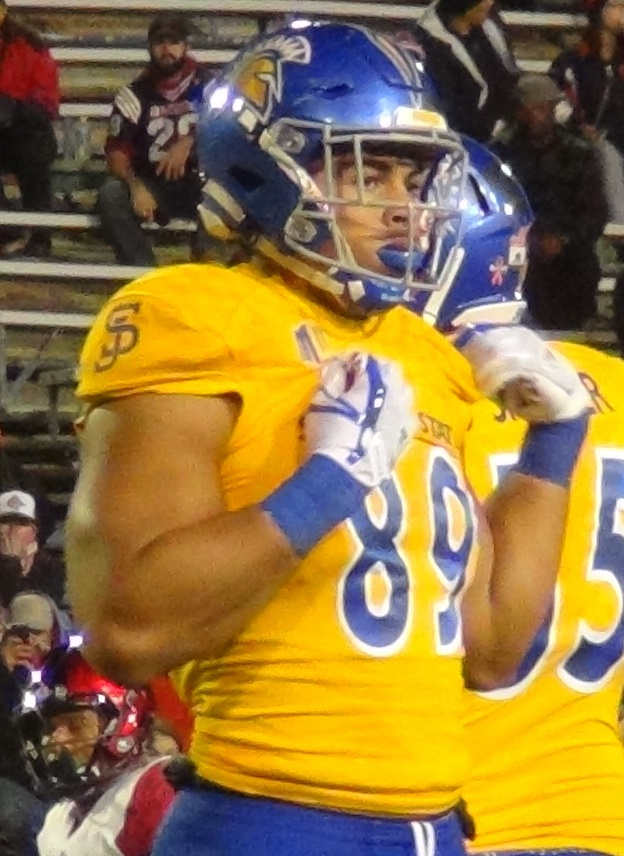
Oliver in 2017 with San Jose State.

Oliver played at SJSU from 2015 to 2018. During his career, he had 98 receptions for 1,067 yards and seven touchdowns, and was a Mountain West Conference All-Academic honoree in all four of his years.

As a freshman, his blocking was reportedly recognized to be a significant contributing factor toward Tyler Ervin breaking the program's single-season rushing yardage record. He also emerged as a receiving threat, with his first collegiate touchdown catch coming during the Spartans' Cure Bowl victory over Georgia State.

Midway through the 2018 season, Oliver won a John Mackey Award as the national tight end of the week after producing eight catches for 158 yards against Hawai'i on September 27 (setting a school single-game receiving yardage record by a tight end).

He earned first-team All-Mountain West Conference selection and served as a team captain in 2018, during a season in which his 56 receptions ranked third among FBS-level tight ends. Oliver was invited to the Senior Bowl after the season.

== Professional career ==
Pre-draft measurables
Height	Weight	Arm length	Hand span	Wingspan	40-yard dash	10-yard split	20-yard split	20-yard shuttle	Three-cone drill	Vertical jump	Broad jump	Bench press
6 ft 4 5/8 in (1.95 m)	249 lb (113 kg)	33 1/2 in (0.85 m)	10 3/4 in (0.27 m)	6 ft 6 7/8 in (2.00 m)	4.63 s	1.56 s	2.76 s	4.47 s	7.21 s	34.0 in (0.86 m)	9 ft 9 in (2.97 m)	22 reps
All values from NFL Combine

=== Jacksonville Jaguars ===
Oliver was drafted by the Jacksonville Jaguars in the third round, 69th overall, of the 2019 NFL draft. He was placed on injured reserve on November 18, 2019.

Oliver had surgery on a broken bone in his foot and was placed on injured reserve again on August 20, 2020.

=== Baltimore Ravens ===
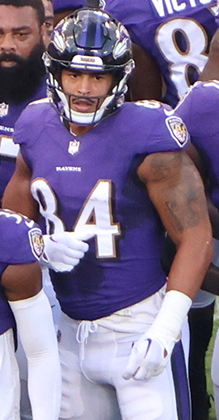
Oliver with the Baltimore Ravens in 2022.

On March 18, 2021, Oliver was traded to the Baltimore Ravens in exchange for a conditional 2022 seventh-round selection. He had nine receptions for 66 yards in 14 games in the 2021 season.

In Week 3 of the 2022 season against the New England Patriots, he caught his first career touchdown pass from a yard out from quarterback Lamar Jackson. He finished the game with two receptions for eight yards and the aforementioned touchdown in the 37–26 win. In the 2022 season, he finished with 14 receptions for 149 yards and two touchdowns. Per Pro Football Focus, Oliver graded as the top run-blocking tight end in the NFL amongst the 53 tight ends who played at least 200 blocking snaps for the year.

=== Minnesota Vikings ===
On March 15, 2023, Oliver signed a three-year, $21 million contract with the Minnesota Vikings. He finished the 2023 season with 22 receptions for 213 yards and two touchdowns.

Oliver finished the 2024 season with 22 receptions for 258 yards and three touchdowns.

On June 10, 2025, Oliver signed a three-year, $23.25 million contract extension with the Vikings.

On September 29, 2026, Oliver was placed on the Vikings injured reserve list after he tore his biceps against the Tampa Bay Buccaneers on week 3.

== NFL career statistics ==
Legend
**Bold**	Career high

=== Regular season ===
Year	Team	Games		Receiving						Fumbles	
Year	Team	GP	GS	Tgt	Rec	Yds	Avg	Lng	TD	Fmb	Lost
2019	JAX	4	1	6	3	15	5.0	6	0	0	0
2021	BAL	14	1	15	9	66	7.3	19	0	**1**	0
2022	BAL	17	9	25	14	149	10.6	**40**	2	0	0
2023	MIN	17	14	**28**	**22**	213	9.7	33	2	**1**	**1**
2024	MIN	15	12	**28**	**22**	**258**	**11.7**	28	3	0	0
2025	MIN	15	7	19	15	160	10.7	32	**4**	0	0
Career		82	44	121	85	861	10.1	40	11	2	1

=== Postseason ===
Year	Team	Games		Receiving						Fumbles	
Year	Team	GP	GS	Tgt	Rec	Yds	Avg	Lng	TD	Fmb	Lost
2022	BAL	1	1	**2**	**2**	**26**	**13.0**	**19**	0	0	0
2024	MIN	1	1	1	1	5	5.0	5	0	0	0
Career		2	2	3	3	31	10.3	19	0	0	0
