= Mount Tahoma High School =

Location
- 4634 S. 74th St. Tacoma, Washington 98409; United States; 47°11′21″N 122°30′06″W

Information
- Type: Public secondary
- Established: 1961
- School district: Tacoma Public Schools
- NCES School ID: 530870001488
- Principal: David McColgan
- Teaching staff: 66.00 (FTE)
- Grades: 9th - 12th
- Enrollment: 1,410 (2024–2025)
- Student to teacher ratio: 21.36
- Colors: Cardinal, White & Gold
- Mascot: Thunderbirds
- Yearbook: Totem
- Website: mt.tacomaschools.org

Mount Tahoma High School is a high school in Tacoma, Washington. It opened in 1961 and is a part of the Tacoma Public Schools. The school's mascot is the Thunderbird as a Native American symbolism for power, protection, and strength.

== History ==
Mount Tahoma opened its doors in the South Tacoma neighborhood in 1961. It is the original Native American name for Mount Rainier. The school was built by a California contractor in the 1960s and wasn't very accommodating for its Washington students. The original school layout consisted of three open air courtyards, with a college style open campus. Frequently, students carried parkas or umbrellas from class to class. 2004 was the last year that students would be in the original Mount Tahoma building. Students and staff moved to the new building, which fit more with the Pacific Northwest weather.

== New building ==
Built in 1961, the setting of Mount Tahoma High School drastically changed in September 2004. The school is located on 74th Street and is overlooked by Mount Rainier (which is the namesake for Mt. Tahoma.) The new campus features 93 teaching spaces, including 81 classrooms, eight technology labs, wireless networking throughout the building, a 600-seat performance arts theatre, two gymnasiums, a pool, weight room, aerobics room, athletic fields and a 3,500 seat stadium. The offices are located in the front of the main entrance and are connected to the large 900-seat commons. There are 9 science classrooms with a 90-foot greenhouse and nursery. Mount Tahoma's counseling center is the hub of career activities, which enable students to access college information and career opportunities.

== Statistics ==
- School Conference - West Central, District 3, Narrows League, Bridge Division
- School Interhigh League - GPS, Greater Puget Sound

== Notable alumni ==
- Ahmad Rashad (Bobby Moore), class of 1968, an Emmy Award winning sportscaster and football wide receiver
- Ron Cey, Class of 1966, Los Angeles Dodgers third baseman from 1973 to 1982 and co-MVP of the 1981 World Series
- Ray Horton, Class of 1978, NFL cornerback and coach, former Tennessee Titans and Cleveland Browns defensive coordinator
- Marilyn Strickland, 38th mayor of Tacoma, Washington and congressional candidate
- Vince Goldsmith, class of 1977, CFL Outstanding Rookie Award. All-Star Linebacker and Defensive Lineman 1981, 1983, 1988 (Saskatchewan Roughriders, Toronto Argonauts, Calgary Stampeders. University of Oregon Hall of Fame, All Conference, All American. Holds Washington State's shot put record for High Schoolers at 69'11".
