= Jim Turner (American football coach) =

American football coach (born 1965)

Rutgers Scarlet Knights
- Title: Offensive line coach

Personal information
- Born: January 15, 1965 (age 61)

Career information
- College: Boston College

Career history
- Braintree High School (1988) Offensive assistant; Kent Rams (1989) Offensive coordinator & player coach; Northeastern (1994–1995) Offensive line & Tight ends; Northeastern (1996) Running backs coach; Northeastern (1997–1998) Defensive line coach; Louisiana Tech (1999) Offensive line coach; Harvard (2000–2002) Offensive line coach; Temple (2003–2004) Offensive line coach; Delaware (2005) Offensive line coach; Delaware (2006) Assistant head coach; Boston College (2007) Offensive line coach; Texas A&M (2008–2011) Offensive line coach; Miami Dolphins (2012–2013) Offensive line coach; Texas A&M (2016–2018) Offensive line coach; Cincinnati Bengals (2019–2020) Offensive line coach; Texas State (2021) Offensive line coach; New Orleans Breakers (2022) Offensive line coach; Memphis Showboats (2023–2024) Offensive line coach; Memphis Showboats (2025) Interim head coach; Rutgers (2026–present) Offensive line coach

Jim Turner (born January 15, 1965) is an American football coach. He has previously served as offensive line coach at Northeastern, Boston College, Temple Owls, Texas A&M, and also coached for the Miami Dolphins and Cincinnati Bengals of the National Football League (NFL).

== Coaching career ==
Turner was with the Miami Dolphins in 2012 and 2013, where he was implicated in a report from Ted Wells in which Turner was part of a "pattern of harassment."

In February, 2019, Turner was hired by the Cincinnati Bengals.

On March 24, 2025, Jim Turner was named the interim head coach for the Memphis Showboats of the United Football League (UFL) after Ken Whisenhunt stepped down. Turner's position was eliminated on October 4, 2025 with the closure of the Showboats, after which he joined the Rutgers Scarlet Knights football team, returning to his position of offensive line coach.

== Head coaching record ==
=== UFL ===
League	Team	Year	Regular season				Postseason			
League	Team	Year	Won	Lost	Win %	Finish	Won	Lost	Win %	Result
UFL	MEM	2025	2	6	.250	4th in USFL Conference	—	—	—	—
Total			2	6	.250		0	0	–	
