= Ray Horton =

American football player and coach (born 1960)

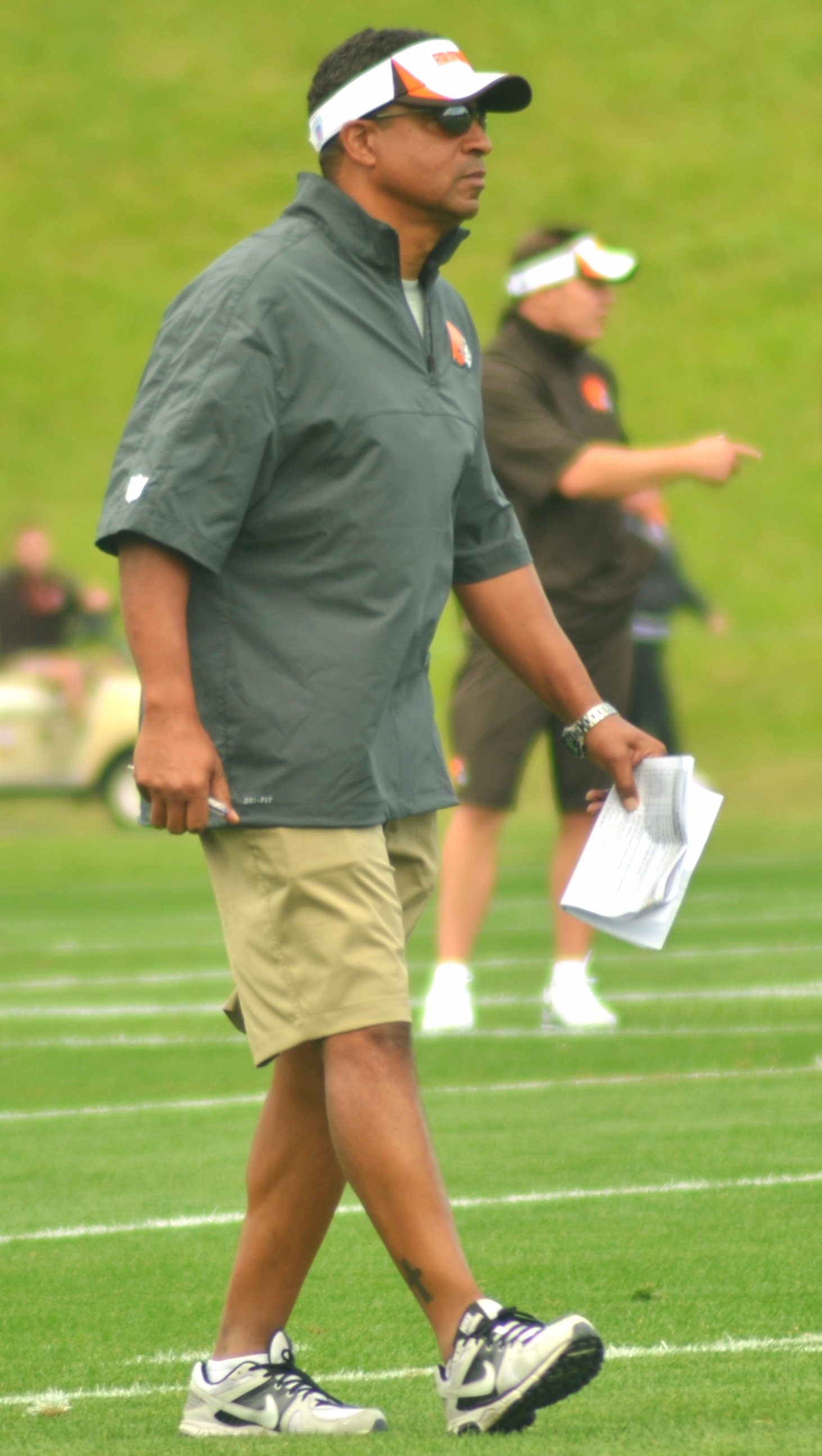
- Horton with the Cleveland Browns in 2013

Personal information
- Born: April 12, 1960 (age 66); Tacoma, Washington, U.S.
- Listed height: 5 ft 10 in (1.78 m)
- Listed weight: 189 lb (86 kg)

Career information
- High school: Mount Tahoma (Tacoma)
- College: Washington (1979-1982)
- NFL draft: 1983: 2nd round, 53rd overall pick

Career history

Playing
- Cincinnati Bengals (1983–1988); Dallas Cowboys (1989–1992)

Coaching
- Washington Redskins (1994–1996) Assistant defensive backs coach; Cincinnati Bengals (1997–2001) Defensive backs coach; Detroit Lions (2002–2003) Secondary coach; Pittsburgh Steelers (2004–2010) Secondary coach; Arizona Cardinals (2011–2012) Defensive coordinator; Cleveland Browns (2013) Defensive coordinator; Tennessee Titans (2014–2015) Defensive coordinator; Cleveland Browns (2016) Defensive coordinator; Washington Redskins (2019) Defensive backs coach; Pittsburgh Maulers (2023) Head coach

Awards and highlights
- As player: Super Bowl champion (XXVII); First-team All-Pac-10 (1981); Second-team All-Pac-10 (1982); As assistant coach: 2× Super Bowl champion (XL, XLIII)

Career NFL statistics
- Interceptions: 19
- Sacks: 3.0
- Touchdowns: 5
- Stats at Pro Football Reference

Head coaching record
- Career: USFL: 5–7 (.417)
- Coaching profile at Pro Football Reference

Raymond Anthony Horton (born April 12, 1960) is an American football coach and former player. He played college football at Washington and was drafted in the second round of the 1983 NFL draft by the Cincinnati Bengals.

== Early life ==
In 1978, Horton graduated early from Mount Tahoma High School in Tacoma, Washington, where he was a prep All-American. In 1999, he was named to the second-team defense of the Washington High School Football Team Of The Century by the Seattle Times newspaper.

== College career ==
Horton accepted a football scholarship from the University of Washington, where he played as a cornerback and on special teams from 1980 to 1982 after a redshirt year. As a sophomore, he started 9 games. As a junior, he was a first-team All-Pac 10 selection and honorable mention All-American. In his last year, he started 9 games, missing 3 contests with an ankle injury (where he was replaced by Vince Newsome).

He finished as a three-year starter with 10 career interceptions, 22 passes defensed, including 14 (school record) in 1981 and played in two Rose Bowls. He was also one of the top punt returners in the nation.

== Professional career ==
=== Cincinnati Bengals ===
Horton was selected by the Cincinnati Bengals in the second round (53rd overall) of the 1983 NFL draft. He also was selected by the Los Angeles Express in the third round (25th overall) of the 1983 USFL draft. Horton decided to sign with the Bengals.

He earned the job as a starting cornerback with Cincinnati by the second game of the season (5 starts), finishing with a franchise rookie record 5 interceptions, including one returned for a touchdown. The next year, Horton was named the regular starter at right cornerback after the retirement of Ken Riley, posting 66 tackles and 3 interceptions, including one returned for a touchdown.

In 1986, he was passed on the depth chart by rookie Lewis Billups and was moved to the nickelback role, making 55 tackles and one interception as the Bengals barely missed the playoffs despite finishing 10-6. In 1987, Horton started 8 games, while replacing an injured Louis Breeden, tallying 53 tackles.

In 1988, he was moved to safety and played mainly nickelback. He recorded 26 tackles, 3 interceptions and one sack as the Bengals won their second AFC Championship. In Super Bowl XXIII, after being up 13–6 over the San Francisco 49ers at the beginning of the fourth quarter, driving from the Bengals 10-yard line, quarterback Joe Montana threw a pass towards Billups that he dropped in the end zone. On the next play, the 49ers scored a touchdown, tying the game at 13. Towards the game's conclusion, Montana threw a 10-yard touchdown pass to John Taylor who was being covered by Horton, for a 20–16 lead with 34 seconds left and the eventual championship. He also was the team's punt returner during the game.

=== Dallas Cowboys ===
On March 14, 1989, the Dallas Cowboys signed Horton as a Plan B free agent with the intention of playing him at safety. He was named the starting free safety, helping anchor the secondary and calling the defensive signals. He collected 116 tackles (second on the team), 8 passes defensed (second on the team), 2 forced fumbles (led the team), one interception and one sack.

In 1990, he sprained his left knee in the fourth game against the New York Giants, that forced him to miss one contest and slowed him the rest of the season. He posted 69 tackles, 6 passes defensed, one interception and 4 fumble recoveries.

In 1991, he finished third on the team in tackles (105), recorded 8 passes defensed, one interception and scored in back-to-back games: a fumble return in a 21–16 win against the New York Giants and a 65-yard interception return in a 20–17 win over the Green Bay Packers. He became the first player in franchise history to score a defensive touchdown in back-to-back games and the third player (Jim Ridlon, 1964 and Larry Cole, 1968) ever to have 2 defensive touchdowns in the same season.

In 1992, he started the first 7 games before tearing his right ACL (he chose not to have surgery) and missing 4 games. He was replaced with James Washington who took over the starting job. He still was able to be part of the championship team in Super Bowl XXVII.

Horton was released on June 1, 1993, with the Cowboys looking to give more opportunities to Washington and Darren Woodson. He finished his career with 19 interceptions, 11 fumble recoveries, 3 sacks and 5 defensive touchdowns.

== Coaching career ==
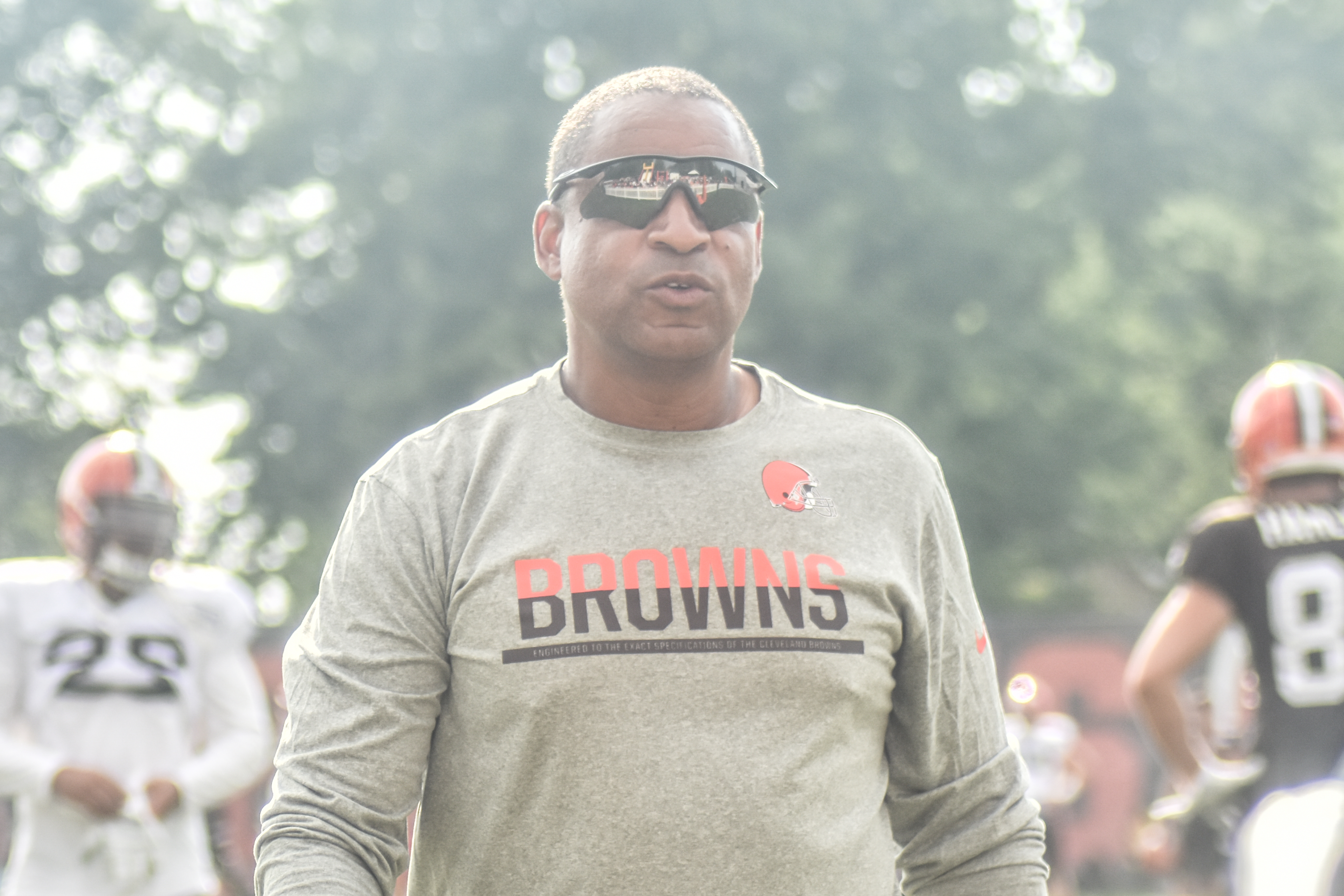
Horton with the Cleveland Browns in 2013

Horton began his coaching career in 1994 as a defensive assistant with the Washington Redskins. He was hired by Norv Turner, who knew him from Dallas where Turner was an offensive coordinator. Horton was the defensive backs coach for the Bengals (1997–2001) and the Detroit Lions (2002–03). He was the assistant defensive backs coach for the Pittsburgh Steelers from 2004 to 2006, before being promoted to defensive backs coach in 2007.

On February 9, 2011, Horton was named defensive coordinator for the Arizona Cardinals. In 2013, Arizona head coach Ken Whisenhunt was fired, though Horton was initially retained and considered for promotion to head coach. On January 17, 2013, Horton was passed over for the promotion in favor of his former fellow Pittsburgh assistant Bruce Arians, leading to his prompt departure from Arizona. During that same offseason, Horton also interviewed for head coaching positions with the Browns and the Buffalo Bills.

On January 18, 2013, Horton was hired as the defensive coordinator of the Browns. On January 18, 2014, Horton agreed to become the defensive coordinator of the Tennessee Titans. Following the 2015 season, Horton was interviewed by the Titans for their open head coaching position, which was ultimately filled by the team's interim head coach Mike Mularkey. In 2022, Horton joined a class-action racial discrimination lawsuit filed by former Miami Dolphins head coach Brian Flores. Horton alleged that his 2016 interview with the Titans was a sham conducted solely to comply with the Rooney Rule. Mularkey had previously revealed that the Titans had promised him the job before they interviewed Horton.

Browns coach Hue Jackson hired Ray Horton to be the Browns defensive coordinator going into the 2016 season. After a single season, Horton was fired by the Browns on January 7, 2017. He was hired as the Redskins' defensive backs coach on January 24, 2019.

== Head coaching record ==
Team	Year	Regular season					Postseason			
Team	Year	Won	Lost	Ties	Win %	Finish	Won	Lost	Win %	Result
PIT	2023	4	6	0	.400	1st	1	1	.500	Lost to Birmingham Stallions in USFL Championship Game
Total		4	6	0	.400		1	1	.500	
