= Jim Monos =

American football coach

Playing career

Football
- 1968: VMI (freshmen)
- 1970–1971: Shippensburg

Baseball
- 1971–1972: Shippensburg
- Positions: Quarterback (football); Shortstop (baseball)

Coaching career (HC unless noted)

Football
- 1972–1974: Sussex Central HS (DE) (assistant)
- 1975: Chambersburg HS (PA) (assistant)
- 1976–1978: Shippensburg (OB/QB)
- 1979–1985: Shippensburg (OC)
- 1986–1996: Lebanon Valley
- 1997–2003: Shippensburg (OC)
- 2004–2015: Lebanon Valley

Head coaching record
- Overall: 109–122–2
- Bowls: 2–1
- Tournaments: 0–1 (NCAA D-III playoffs)

Accomplishments and honors

Championships
- 1 MAC (2013)

Jim Monos is an American former football coach. He served two stints as the head football coach at Lebanon Valley College in Annville, Pennsylvania, from 1986 to 1996 and again from 2004 to 2015, compiling a record of 109–122–2 in 23 seasons. Monos played college football at Virginia Military Institute (VMI) and Shippensburg University. He was an assistant coach at Shippensburg from 1976 to 1985 and as its offensive coordinator from 1997 to 2003.

Monos retired at the end of the 2015 season. He was inducted into the Lebanon Valley College Hall of Fame in 2017. He has also been inducted into the Shippensburg University Athletic Hall of Fame.

== Head coaching record ==
Year	Team	Overall	Conference	Standing	Bowl/playoffs
Lebanon Valley Flying Dutchmen (Middle Atlantic Conference) (1986–1996)
1986	Lebanon Valley	2–8	1–8	9th	
1987	Lebanon Valley	2–8	1–8	T–8th	
1988	Lebanon Valley	3–6–1	2–6	7th	
1989	Lebanon Valley	6–4	4–4	5th	
1990	Lebanon Valley	4–6	3–5	6th	
1991	Lebanon Valley	6–3–1	5–3	T–3rd	
1992	Lebanon Valley	7–3	5–3	3rd	
1993	Lebanon Valley	5–5	3–2	T–2nd (Commonwealth)	
1994	Lebanon Valley	3–6	2–3	T–4th (Commonwealth)	
1995	Lebanon Valley	3–7	1–4	T–5th (Commonwealth)	
1996	Lebanon Valley	1–9	0–5	6th (Commonwealth)	
Lebanon Valley Flying Dutchmen (Middle Atlantic Conference) (2004–2015)
2004	Lebanon Valley	4–6	3–6	T–7th	
2005	Lebanon Valley	2–8	2–7	9th	
2006	Lebanon Valley	6–4	5–4	T–5th	
2007	Lebanon Valley	4–6	3–4	T–5th	
2008	Lebanon Valley	6–4	4–3	T–4th	
2009	Lebanon Valley	9–2	5–2	3rd	W ECAC Southwest Bowl
2010	Lebanon Valley	6–5	5–2	T–2nd	L ECAC South Atlantic Bowl
2011	Lebanon Valley	8–3	5–3	4th	W ECAC South-West Bowl
2012	Lebanon Valley	6–4	5–4	5th	
2013	Lebanon Valley	8–3	7–2	T–1st	L NCAA Division III First Round
2014	Lebanon Valley	3–7	3–6	7th	
2015	Lebanon Valley	5–5	5–4	5th	
Lebanon Valley:		109–122–2	79–98		
Total:		109–122–2			
National championship Conference title Conference division title or championship game berth
