= Pittsburgh Maulers (2022) =

Football team in Pittsburgh, Pennsylvania

Logo

General information
- Founded: 2021
- Folded: 2023
- Headquartered: Tom Benson Hall of Fame Stadium in Canton, Ohio
- Colors: Black, gold, white
- Mascot: Marty the Mauler

Personnel
- Owners: National Spring Football League Enterprises Co, LLC, (Fox Sports)
- General manager: Lonnie Young (2023)
- Head coach: Kirby Wilson (2022); Ray Horton (2023)

Team history
- Pittsburgh Maulers (2022–2023)

Home fields
- Protective Stadium / Legion Field (2022); Tom Benson Hall of Fame Stadium (2023)

League / conference affiliations
- United States Football League (2022–2023): North Division (2022–2023)

Championships
- Division championships: 1; 2023

Playoff appearances (1)
- 2023

The Pittsburgh Maulers were a professional American football team based in Pittsburgh, Pennsylvania but played their home games in Canton, Ohio. The Maulers competed in the United States Football League (USFL) North division.

Founded in 2021, the Maulers were one of the eight inaugural teams for the re-launch of the original United States Football League which ceased operations in 1986. They played their home games at Tom Benson Hall of Fame Stadium in Canton, Ohio in 2023, which also hosts the Pro Football Hall of Fame Game. Prior to Tom Benson Hall of Fame Stadium, the Maulers had played their home games in Protective Stadium and at Legion Field in 2022. The Maulers posted a 3–15 record through their first 18 games, identical to the original Maulers franchise during its lone season in 1984. However, the Maulers then won their final two games of the 2023 season to clinch the USFL North division title, and then won their first playoff game to advance to the 2023 USFL Championship Game.

On December 19, 2023, the USFL informed its players union that the Maulers would not be included in the league's upcoming merger with the XFL.

== History ==
The Pittsburgh Maulers were one of eight teams that were officially announced as a USFL franchise on The Herd with Colin Cowherd on November 22, 2021, Their first head coach was announced on January 20, 2022, when it was announced on The Herd with Colin Cowherd that former NFL running backs coach Kirby Wilson was named the Head Coach and General Manager of the Maulers. Wilson revealed on February 9, 2022, that UConn Defensive Coordinator Jarren Horton would become the Defensive Coordinator for the Maulers, while Wilson would call the offense. They made their first draft pick in franchise history, selecting quarterback Kyle Lauletta 7th overall. They drafted 35 players from February 22–23 in 2022.

The team begun the season 0–4, the worst in the league, but defeated the Houston Gamblers 21–20 behind an off the bench effort by newly signed quarterback Vad Lee. Finishing with a record of 1–9, the worst record in the league, the team did not win the rights to the first overall pick in the 2023 USFL draft, after the league decided that the winner of the Week 10 game between the 1–8 Maulers and 1–8 Michigan Panthers, would win the first overall pick. The Panthers were victorious 21–33.

On October 18, 2022, the Maulers named Lonnie Young as the team's new general manager. In early January, 2023, Wilson stepped down as the head coach of the Maulers, citing personal reasons. He was replaced on January 17, 2023, by Ray Horton.

On December 19, 2023, the USFL informed its players union that the Maulers were not one of the four USFL teams chosen to participate in the league's upcoming merger with the XFL.

=== Logo and uniforms ===
The team's 2022 colors of orange and purple were slightly different from what was used by the Pittsburgh Maulers team in the original USFL, as they used red and purple. In any event, the colors were a radical departure from the city's traditional sporting colors of black and gold and are more or less of an ode to the original Maulers franchise.

The logo depicts a worker swinging a large hammer, as an ode to the steel workers that Pittsburgh's history is known for. The current jerseys were a different design than the originals, with the home being purple with an orange bar across the shoulders and the away being white with a purple bar along the shoulders.

In 2023, the Maulers changed their team's colors to the traditional city colors of black, gold, and white.

== Player history ==
=== Current NFL players ===
USFL Season	Pos	Name	NFL team
2022	LS	Mitchell Fraboni	Denver Broncos
2022	DT	Jeremiah Pharms Jr.	New England Patriots

=== Notable players ===
USFL Season	Pos	Name	Notes
2023	LB	Reuben Foster	Former San Francisco 49ers Linebacker, 2017 1st Round Pick

== Coach history ==
=== Head coach history ===
#	Name	Term	Regular season				Playoffs			Awards
#	Name	Term	GC	W	L	Win %	GC	W	L	Awards
Pittsburgh Maulers
1	Kirby Wilson	2022	10	1	9	.100	–	–	–	
2	Ray Horton	2023	10	4	6	.400	2	1	1	

=== Offensive coordinator history ===
#	Name	Term	Regular season				Playoffs			Awards
#	Name	Term	GC	W	L	Win %	GC	W	L	Awards
Pittsburgh Maulers
1	John Tomlinson	2022–2023	20	5	15	.250	2	1	1	

=== Defensive coordinator history ===
#	Name	Term	Regular season				Playoffs			Awards
#	Name	Term	GC	W	L	Win %	GC	W	L	Awards
Piitsburgh Maulers
1	Jarren Horton	2022-2023	20	5	15	.250	2	1	1	

== Championships ==
=== North Division championships ===
Season	Coach	Location	Opponent	Score
2023	Ray Horton	Tom Benson Hall of Fame Stadium (Canton, Ohio)	Michigan Panthers	31–27
Total North Division Championships won: 1				

== Records ==
All-time Maulers leaders
Leader	Player	Record	Years with Maulers
Passing yards	Troy Williams	1,414 passing yards	2023
Passing Touchdowns	Troy Williams Vad Lee	6 passing touchdowns	2023 2022
Rushing yards	Madre London	669 rushing yards	2022-2023
Rushing Touchdowns	Troy Williams	3 rushing touchdowns	2023
Receiving yards	Bailey Gaither	698 receiving yards	2022-2023
Receiving Touchdowns	Isiah Hennie	6 receiving touchdowns	2022-2023
Receptions	Bailey Gaither	59 receptions	2022-2023
Tackles	Kyahva Tezino	180 tackles	2022-2023
Sacks	Olive Sagapolu	6.0 sacks	2022–2023
Interceptions	Mark Gilbert; Arnold Tarpley III	4 interceptions	2023; 2022–2023
Coaching wins	Ray Horton	4 wins	2023

== Statistics and records ==
=== Season-by-season record ===
Note: The finish, wins, losses, and ties columns list regular season results and exclude any postseason play.

Legend
USFL champions^{†}	Division champions^{^}	Wild Card berth^{#}

Pittsburgh Maulers season-by-season records
Season	Team	League	Division	Regular season					Postseason results	Awards
Season	Team	League	Division	Finish	Wins	Losses	Ties	Pct	Postseason results	Awards
2022	2022	USFL	North	4th	1	9	0	.100	–	–
2023	2023	USFL	North	1st^{^}	4	6	0	.400	Won Division Finals (vs. Panthers) 31–27 (OT); Lost USFL Championship (vs. Stallions) 12–28	Jarren Horton (Assistant Coach of the Year)
Totals					5	15	0	.250	(2022–2023, regular season)	
Totals					1	1	0	.500	(2022–2023, playoffs)	
Totals					6	16	0	.273	(2022–2023, regular season and playoffs)	

=== Rivalries ===
==== Key Stone State Battle ====
The Pittsburgh Maulers shared a rivalry with their cross-state foes the Philadelphia Stars called the Key Stone State Battle. The Maulers went 1–3 against Philadelphia during both USFL seasons.

==== Franchise matchup history ====
Team	Record	Pct.
Michigan Panthers	3–2	.600
Houston Gamblers	1–1	.500
New Jersey Generals	1–3	.250
Philadelphia Stars	1–3	.250
Memphis Showboats	0–1	.000
Tampa Bay Bandits	0–1	.000
New Orleans Breakers	0–2	.000
Birmingham Stallions	0–3	.000
