= Paso Robles, California =

City in California, United States

- City
- El Paso de Robles
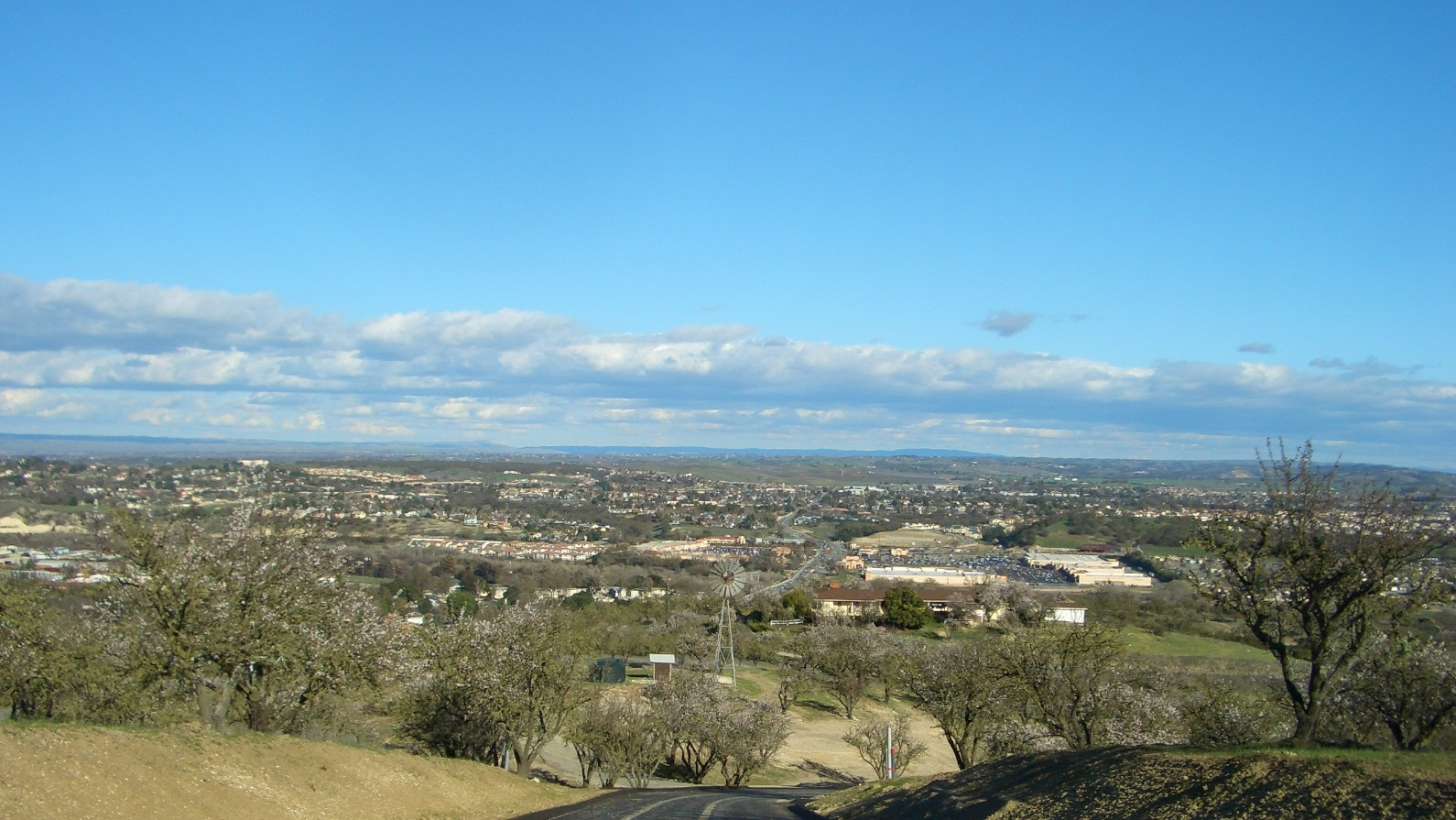
- View of Paso Robles

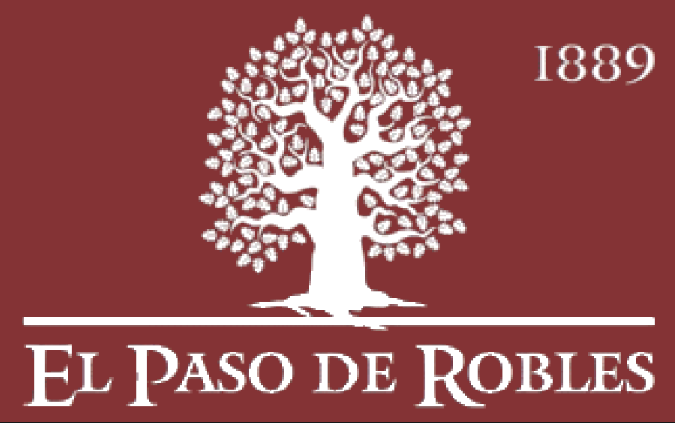
- Flag Seal
- Interactive map of Paso Robles, California
- Location in California Location in the United States
- Coordinates: 35.628513°N 120.650356°W
- Country: United States
- State: California
- County: San Luis Obispo
- Incorporated: March 11, 1889
- Named for: Spanish for "Pass of the Oaks"

Government
  - Type: Council–manager
  - Body: Paso Robles City Council
  - Mayor: John Hamon
  - City manager: Chris Huot
  - Councilmembers: Chris Bausch; Kris Beal; Steve Gregory; Fred Strong
  - State Assembly: Dawn Addis
  - State Senate: John Laird
  - U.S. House: Jimmy Panetta

Area (2020)
  - Total: 19.662 sq mi (50.92 km^{2})
  - Land: 19.650 sq mi (50.89 km^{2})
  - Water: 0.012 sq mi (0.031 km^{2}) 0.06%
- Elevation: 732 ft (223 m)

Population (2020)
  - Total: 31,490
  - Density: 1,602.5/sq mi (618.7/km^{2})
- Time zone: UTC−08:00 (Pacific)
  - Summer (DST): UTC−07:00 (PDT)
- ZIP Codes: 93446, 93447
- Area codes: 805 and 820
- FIPS code: 06-22300
- GNIS feature IDs: 254139, 2410415
- Website: www.prcity.com

Paso Robles, officially El Paso de Robles, is a city in San Luis Obispo County, California, United States. Its population was 31,490 at the 2020 census. The city lies along the Salinas River on California's Central Coast.

According to anthropologists Randall Milliken and John R. Johnson, Northern Chumash communities inhabited the area at Spanish contact, and Salinan communities later lived in the upper Salinas corridor. Spanish missions displaced residents of the region's villages. The modern town developed around mineral springs and the railroad and incorporated in 1889. Agriculture, military activity at nearby Camp Roberts, and later suburban growth contributed to its expansion.

Paso Robles is a center of the surrounding Paso Robles wine region. Wine production and tourism have reshaped its economy, while housing costs and water availability have become local concerns. The city hosts the California Mid-State Fair and has a municipal airport, an Amtrak station, and the North County campus of Cuesta College.

== Etymology ==
The official name, El Paso de Robles, means "Pass of the Oaks" in Spanish and is commonly shortened to Paso Robles. Local pronunciations include the anglicized ROH-buhlz and the Spanish-influenced ROH-blays. A 2015 report by KCBX documented both pronunciations and differing local views about their use. Some locals shorten its name even further to just "PR".

== History ==
=== Indigenous peoples and Spanish colonization ===
Reconstructions of the area's Indigenous linguistic geography have differed. In a study prepared for Caltrans, anthropologists Randall Milliken and John R. Johnson concluded that Northern Chumash speakers inhabited the Paso Robles area at Spanish contact. Using mission registers, early accounts, and later interviews with Native consultants, they placed the Chumash–Salinan linguistic boundary south of Mission San Miguel, near San Marcos Creek. Their reconstruction identifies several village communities in the Paso Robles region, although some locations remain uncertain.

In a tribal-authored account published by Cal Poly, the yak tityu tityu yak tiłhini Northern Chumash Tribe identifies Paso Robles with elewexe, a village name referring to swordfish. The account describes the Salinas River, fishing, waterways, and thermal springs as parts of the community's relationship with the place.

Spanish colonization drew local people into the mission system. Milliken and Johnson found that by the end of 1805 the villages of the Paso Robles and Santa Margarita regions had been emptied, with their residents at Mission San Luis Obispo. They distinguish this contact-era geography from nineteenth-century settlement: Salinan speakers subsequently lived along the San Miguel–Santa Margarita corridor, where Mission San Miguel expanded its ranching activities during the 1820s.

The mission system throughout California imposed conversion and controlled Native labor and movement; disease and poor living conditions caused extensive loss of life. Native people also maintained kinship networks, food practices, and ceremonies, and resisted mission control through flight and other means. At nearby Mission San Miguel, founded in 1797, Salinan people made adobe bricks and tiles and built the church completed in 1818. Indigenous artists painted its interior under the direction of Esteban Munras in 1821. The mission was secularized in 1834.

Indigenous communities continue cultural work in the region. The Northern Chumash tribe's language program draws on records made by linguist John Peabody Harrington with Native speakers. The Salinan Tribe describes cultural education and the continuation of gathering, hunting, and fishing among its activities. The Paso Robles History Museum's Salinan exhibit includes materials provided by the tribe and tribal member Patti Dunton.

=== Town development ===
Mexican governor Manuel Micheltorena granted Rancho Paso de Robles to Pedro Narváez in 1844; Narváez transferred it to Petronilo Ríos the following year. In 1857, James and Daniel Blackburn and Lazarus Godchaux purchased the Paso Robles rancho from Petronilo Ríos. Development around the hot springs included a hotel and baths in 1864. Drury James subsequently acquired an interest in the property. The first train arrived on October 31, 1886, and an auction the following month sold 228 town lots. A larger hotel and bathhouse opened in 1891. The city incorporated on March 11, 1889.

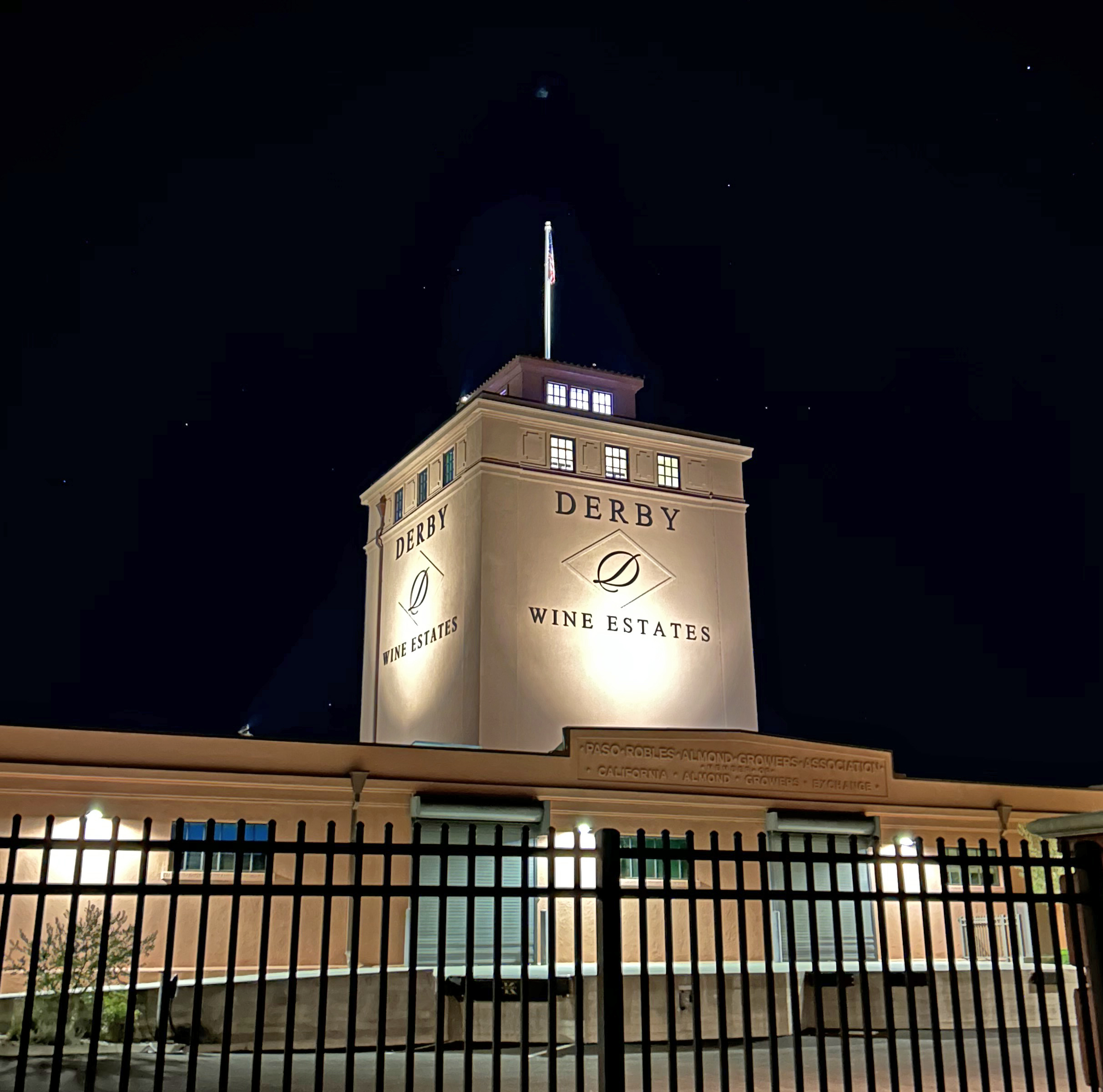
The former almond growers' building in 2024

Almond growing became a local industry in the early twentieth century. Growers built a cooperative warehouse in 1922, but the industry declined during the 1930s as orchards encountered growing and moisture problems. The Farmers Alliance acquired the warehouse in 1936.

The pianist and Polish statesman Ignacy Jan Paderewski bought ranch property near Paso Robles in February 1914 and retained it until his death in 1941. His holdings included Rancho San Ignacio and Rancho Santa Helena, with vineyards, almond trees, and other fruit and nut crops. Viticulture also developed through immigrant farming families. During Prohibition, some growers sustained their businesses by shipping grapes to people making wine at home.

=== Wartime and later growth ===
The opening of Camp Roberts in 1941 increased demand for housing. Oak Park was built that year for enlisted personnel's families. After the war, residential development continued, and the population rose from 3,045 in 1940 to 6,677 in 1960. A new U.S. Route 101 alignment bypassed Spring Street in 1958. Annexations extended the city east of the Salinas River, including Sherwood Acres in 1952 and the Orchard Tract in 1957.

The wine industry expanded during the late twentieth century. The Paso Robles wine festival began in 1983, the same year that the surrounding region received an American Viticultural Area designation. Further growth during the 1990s helped turn wine tourism into a part of the local economy.

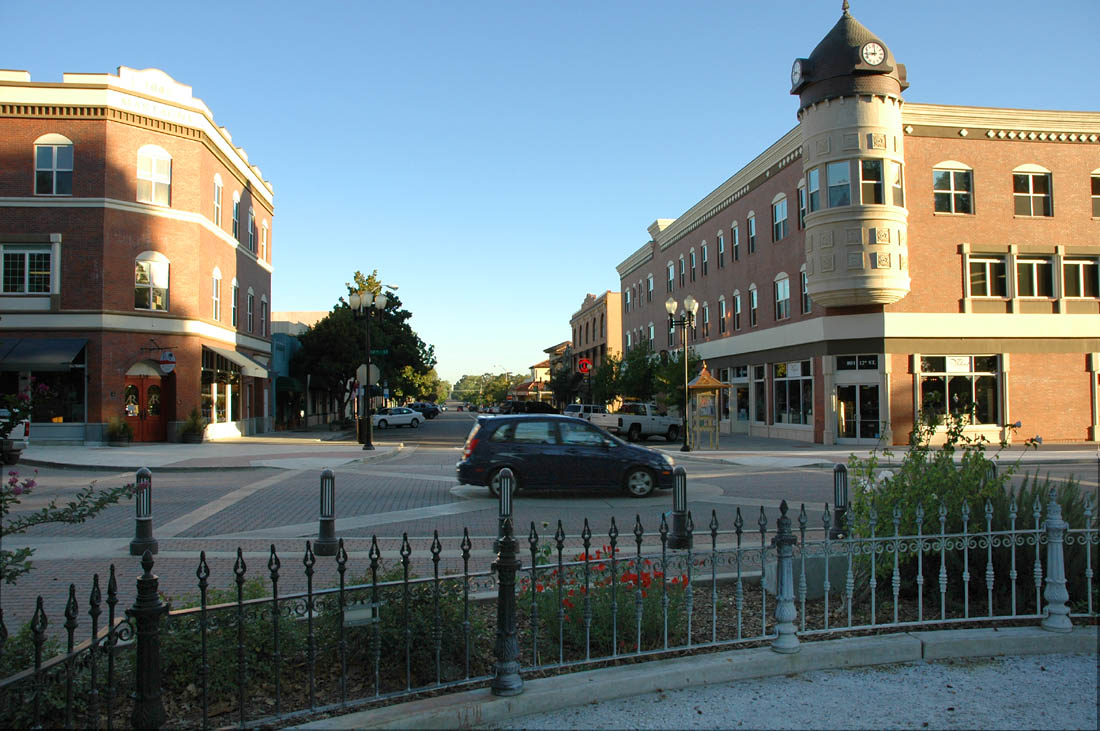
Downtown Paso Robles

On December 22, 2003, the magnitude 6.5 San Simeon earthquake damaged downtown Paso Robles. Two people died when an unreinforced masonry building collapsed. The earthquake also altered the flow of local hot springs. The California Seismic Safety Commission's investigation emphasized the vulnerability of unreinforced masonry and the need for seismic retrofitting.

== Geography ==
Paso Robles is in inland San Luis Obispo County, approximately midway between Los Angeles and San Francisco. The city extends across the Salinas River, with twentieth-century annexations adding neighborhoods on its eastern side. The United States Geological Survey lists an elevation of 732 feet (223 m) for the populated place. The Census Bureau's 2020 gazetteer records 19.650 square miles (50.89 km^{2}) of land and 0.012 square miles (0.031 km^{2}) of water within the city.

=== Climate ===
Paso Robles has hot, dry summers and cooler, wetter winters. At the city's National Oceanic and Atmospheric Administration (NOAA) weather station, the 1991–2020 average daily maximum was 92.1 °F (33.4 °C) in August and 61.3 °F (16.3 °C) in December. Annual precipitation averaged 15.26 inches (388 mm), concentrated in the winter months. The station averaged about 21 days annually with temperatures of at least 100 °F (38 °C) and 54 nights with temperatures at or below freezing.

Climate data for Paso Robles, California (1991–2020 normals)
Month	Jan	Feb	Mar	Apr	May	Jun	Jul	Aug	Sep	Oct	Nov	Dec	Year
Mean daily maximum °F (°C)	61.9 (16.6)	63.8 (17.7)	68.1 (20.1)	73.0 (22.8)	79.5 (26.4)	86.6 (30.3)	90.5 (32.5)	92.1 (33.4)	89.2 (31.8)	80.6 (27.0)	69.3 (20.7)	61.3 (16.3)	76.3 (24.6)
Daily mean °F (°C)	48.1 (8.9)	50.3 (10.2)	53.9 (12.2)	57.2 (14.0)	62.8 (17.1)	68.3 (20.2)	72.0 (22.2)	72.4 (22.4)	69.3 (20.7)	62.0 (16.7)	53.0 (11.7)	47.0 (8.3)	59.7 (15.4)
Mean daily minimum °F (°C)	34.2 (1.2)	36.8 (2.7)	39.6 (4.2)	41.4 (5.2)	46.1 (7.8)	50.0 (10.0)	53.4 (11.9)	52.6 (11.4)	49.5 (9.7)	43.4 (6.3)	36.6 (2.6)	32.6 (0.3)	43.0 (6.1)
Average precipitation inches (mm)	3.44 (87)	3.24 (82)	2.84 (72)	0.81 (21)	0.36 (9.1)	0.04 (1.0)	0.10 (2.5)	0.02 (0.51)	0.08 (2.0)	0.66 (17)	1.16 (29)	2.51 (64)	15.26 (388)
Source: NOAA (station USC00046730)

== Demographics ==
Historical population
Census	Pop.	Note	%±
1890	827		—
1900	1,224		48.0%
1910	1,441		17.7%
1920	1,919		33.2%
1930	2,573		34.1%
1940	3,045		18.3%
1950	4,835		58.8%
1960	6,677		38.1%
1970	7,168		7.4%
1980	9,163		27.8%
1990	18,583		102.8%
2000	24,297		30.7%
2010	29,793		22.6%
2020	31,490		5.7%
Sources: City of Paso Robles; U.S. Census Bureau.

The 2020 census counted 31,490 residents, compared with 29,793 in 2010. The Census Bureau estimated the population at 31,626 on July 1, 2025.

The 2020–2024 American Community Survey estimated that 25.2 percent of residents were under 18 and 20.9 percent were 65 or older. The estimated racial composition was 60.3 percent White alone, 0.4 percent Black alone, 2.0 percent American Indian or Alaska Native alone, 3.0 percent Asian alone, 13.9 percent another race alone, and 20.5 percent multiracial. Hispanic or Latino residents, who may be of any race, accounted for 36.7 percent.

For 2020–2024, the American Community Survey estimated 11,979 households, averaging 2.60 people. An estimated 15.2 percent of residents were foreign-born, and 27.5 percent of people aged five and older spoke a language other than English at home. Owner-occupied units accounted for 61.3 percent of occupied housing. Median household income was US$92,228 in 2024 dollars; the median value of owner-occupied housing was $687,200 and median gross rent was $1,981.

The contemporary population also includes Indigenous migrants from Latin America. In 2023, researchers working with the Mixteco/Indígena Community Organizing Project surveyed Indigenous residents through its Paso Robles office to identify needs that broader Latino demographic categories could obscure. Initial findings included participants living in Paso Robles and working in viticulture; researchers emphasized that the size of the county's Indigenous Latin American population was not well documented.

== Economy ==
Paso Robles serves the surrounding wine-growing region. The Paso Robles American Viticultural Area was established in 1983; its boundaries encompass a larger area than the city. Wine tourism supports tasting rooms, restaurants, and accommodation businesses. Reporting by KCBX in 2022 described both the industry's economic growth and difficulties retaining agricultural and hospitality workers who could not afford local housing. Some vineyard workers commuted from Santa Maria, and seasonal labor demand added to employers' recruitment problems.

The Census Bureau reported $1.085 billion in retail sales and $231.9 million in accommodation and food-service sales in the city in 2022. Municipal economic-development programs target manufacturing, tourism, retail, and housing.

== Arts and culture ==
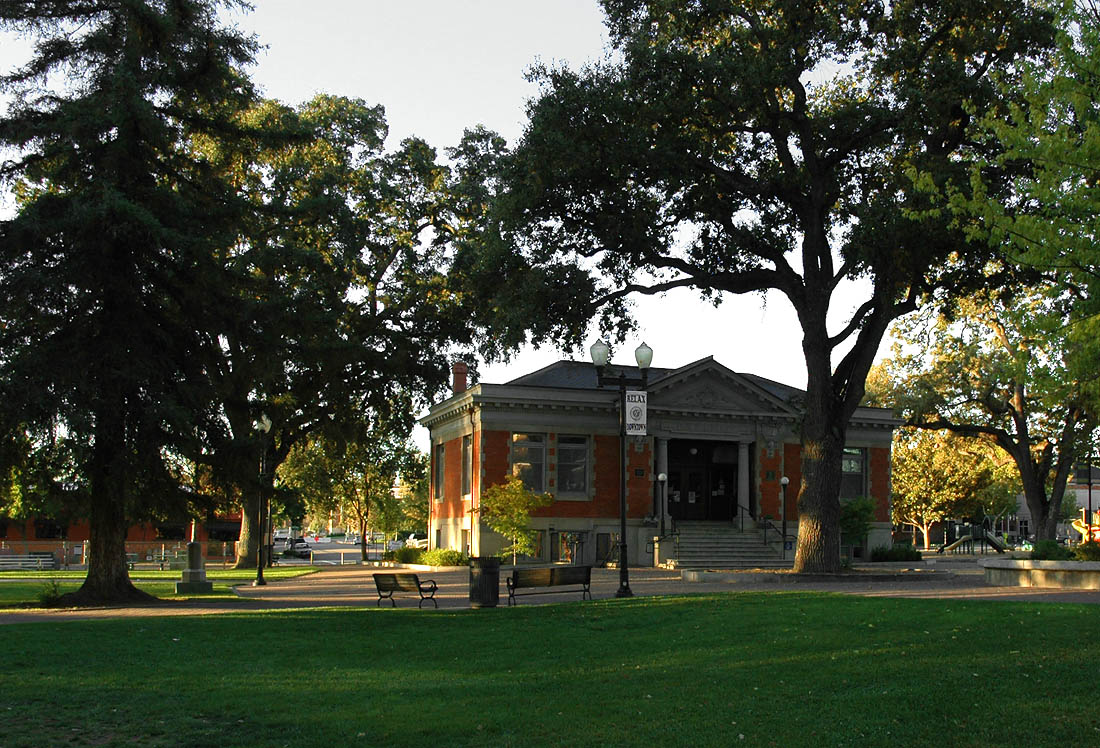
The former Carnegie library houses the Paso Robles History Museum.

The California Mid-State Fair, first held in 1946, takes place over 12 days in July. Its programs include livestock exhibitions, agricultural displays, competitions, and concerts. Annual wine-industry events include Paso Wine Fest in May and harvest events in October.

Pioneer Day began in 1931, when local businesspeople organized a celebration to thank the surrounding ranching community.

The Paderewski Festival commemorates the pianist's association with the area. The University of Southern California's Polish Music Center participates in the festival and its musical exchange activities. The Paso Robles History Museum occupies the former Carnegie library in Downtown City Park. Its exhibits cover local history, including Salinan culture and Camp Roberts.

Vina Robles Amphitheatre, a 3,000-capacity outdoor concert venue, opened in 2013. Nederlander Concerts acquired the amphitheatre and adjoining properties in 2026.

== Parks and recreation ==
The city's parks include Downtown City Park, Centennial Park, and Barney Schwartz Park. Downtown City Park occupies 4.8 acres (1.9 ha) and contains the former Carnegie library, a gazebo, and a playground. Centennial Park's 16 acres (6.5 ha) include a gymnasium, swimming facilities, an amphitheater, trails, and sports courts. The 40-acre (16 ha) Barney Schwartz Park has playing fields, a lake, playgrounds, and walking paths.

Sherwood Park includes baseball, softball and soccer fields, a dog park and a playground. Nearby Lake Nacimiento, outside the city, supports boating, fishing and water skiing.

Paso Robles hosted stage finishes of the Tour of California cycling race in 2009 and 2011.

== Government ==
Paso Robles is a general-law city with a council–manager government. The council consists of a mayor elected citywide and four members elected from districts. The city changed from at-large council elections following a challenge under the California Voting Rights Act. Municipal services include police and fire protection, water and wastewater services, parks, the library, and the airport.

As of September 2026, the mayor is John Hamon, and the councilmembers are Chris Bausch, Kris Beal, Steve Gregory, and Fred Strong. Chris Huot became city manager in April 2025.

In the California State Legislature, the city is represented by Dawn Addis in the 30th Assembly district and John Laird in the 17th Senate district. Its representative in the United States House of Representatives is Jimmy Panetta of California's 19th district.

== Education ==
The Paso Robles Joint Unified School District operates six elementary schools, Lewis Flamson Junior High School, and Paso Robles High School. Its alternative programs include Liberty Continuation High School, Independence High School, and the Paso Robles Independent Study Center.

Cuesta College opened its North County campus in Paso Robles in fall 1998, initially enrolling about 1,200 students. The 105-acre (42 ha) campus was established with private donations. Later construction included a permanent classroom building in 2005, a learning resource center in 2012, and a campus center in 2018.

== Media ==
Local news publications include the weekly Paso Robles Press and the online Paso Robles Daily News. KPRL broadcasts news, talk and sports on 1230 AM and 99.3 FM.

== Infrastructure ==
=== Transportation ===
U.S. Route 101 and State Route 46 serve the city. Route 46 is an east–west connection between the Central Coast and the Central Valley.

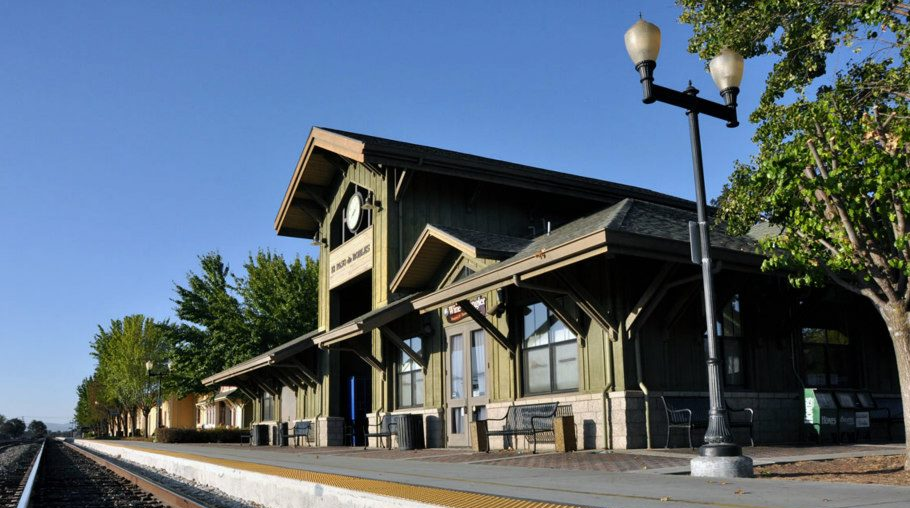
Paso Robles station

Paso Robles station is served by Amtrak's daily Coast Starlight, which connects Los Angeles and Seattle. San Luis Obispo Regional Transit Authority Route 9 links Paso Robles with San Miguel, Templeton, Atascadero, and San Luis Obispo. Local routes A and B circulate within Paso Robles and connect with Route 9.

Paso Robles Municipal Airport is approximately 4 miles (6.4 km) northeast of downtown. It accommodates private and charter aviation but has no scheduled airline service.

=== Water ===
The municipal water supply combines shallow wells along the Salinas River, groundwater from the Paso Robles basin, and water from Lake Nacimiento. According to the city, its seven shallow river wells normally provide more than half of its supply. Its Nacimiento entitlement is 6,488 acre-feet (8,000,000 m^{3}) annually.

Groundwater depletion is a concern in the wider Paso Robles basin. In December 2025, KCBX reported continuing rural well failures and plans by the Paso Robles Area Groundwater Authority to expand monitoring and management. In 2023, the city approved funding for a recycled-water pipeline intended to supply vineyards and parks east of the city and reduce groundwater pumping.

== Notable people ==
- Frank Armitage, artist and former Disney Imagineer who retired in Paso Robles.
- Dylan Beavers, baseball player from Paso Robles.
- Casey Biggs, actor and Paso Robles resident.
- Jason Botts, baseball player born in Paso Robles.
- Josh Brolin, actor who grew up on a ranch in Paso Robles.
- Bailey Gaither, football player from Paso Robles.
- Larry Grant, football player who coached Paso Robles High School.
- Dennis Harrah, former NFL offensive lineman and Paso Robles resident.
- Terry Hoage, former NFL player who owned a winery near Paso Robles until 2023.
- Derrick Jasper, basketball player from Paso Robles.
- Rusty Kuntz, baseball player who attended Paso Robles High School.
- Frank Minini, football player born in Paso Robles.
- Josh Oliver, football player from Paso Robles who attended Paso Robles High School.
- Don Parish, football player who attended Paso Robles High School.
- Hamp Pool, football player and coach who graduated from Paso Robles High School.
- Hal Rhyne, baseball player born in Paso Robles.
- Hunter Tylo, actress who has lived in Paso Robles.
- Mitchell Van Dyk, football player from Paso Robles.
- Elena Verdugo, actress born in Paso Robles.
- King Vidor, film director who died at his Paso Robles ranch in 1982.
- Jake Zemke, motorcycle racer who has lived in Paso Robles.

== See also ==
- National Register of Historic Places listings in San Luis Obispo County, California
