= Cascade Christian Schools =

Private school district in Washington, United States

Location
- Pierce County, Washington United States
- Coordinates: 47°11′03″N 122°16′00″W

District information
- Type: Nondenominational Christian
- Motto: Dedicated to Developing Discerning Leaders
- Grades: Infants - Grade 12
- Established: 1992
- Superintendent: Dr. Ken Friesen
- Schools: Elementary school campuses (Puyallup, Orting, Washington (mcalder) and Frederickson, Washington), early leaning centers, junior/senior high school

Students and staff
- Students: 1700
- Athletic conference: Nisqually League
- District mascot: Cougar

Other information
- Website: www.cascadechristian.org

Cascade Christian Schools (CCS) is a district of private schools in Pierce County with students , Washington, United States. They are three elementary school campuses in (Puyallup, Frederickson, and the Sumner-Orting Valley) three early learning centers, and a junior high/high school, providing Christ-centered education for approximately 1700 students. Their motto is "To glorify God by providing an excellent Christ-centered education dedicated to developing discerning leaders who are spiritually, personally, and academically prepared to impact their world".

== History ==
Officially founded in 1992 by three church affiliated schools in Pierce County, Cascade Christian Schools began educating students in a nondenominational Christian environment in the fall of 1993. CCS had its first graduating class in the spring of 1994.

== Athletics ==
Cascade Christian participates in 1A sports in the Nisqually league in football, baseball, wrestling, fastpitch, volleyball, track and field, cross-country, basketball (men's and women's), soccer (men's and women's), tennis (men's and women's), and golf (men's and women's).

The CCS mascot is the Cougar.

The CCS high school football team plays at Sunset Stadium in Sumner. The other high school teams play in the Junior High/High School gymnasium, performing arts center, or on the school's track area.

Notable athletic accomplishments include:

- 2010, 2011 WIAA 1-A High School Boys' Basketball State Champions
- 2009 Woman's Golf state champions
- 2008–2010 WIAA Cheerleading state champions, small category
- 2010, 2014 WIAA 1-A High School Football state champions

== Notable alumni ==
- Ryan Moore - professional golfer on the PGA Tour; graduated in 2001
