= Brandon Stephens =

American football player (born 1997)

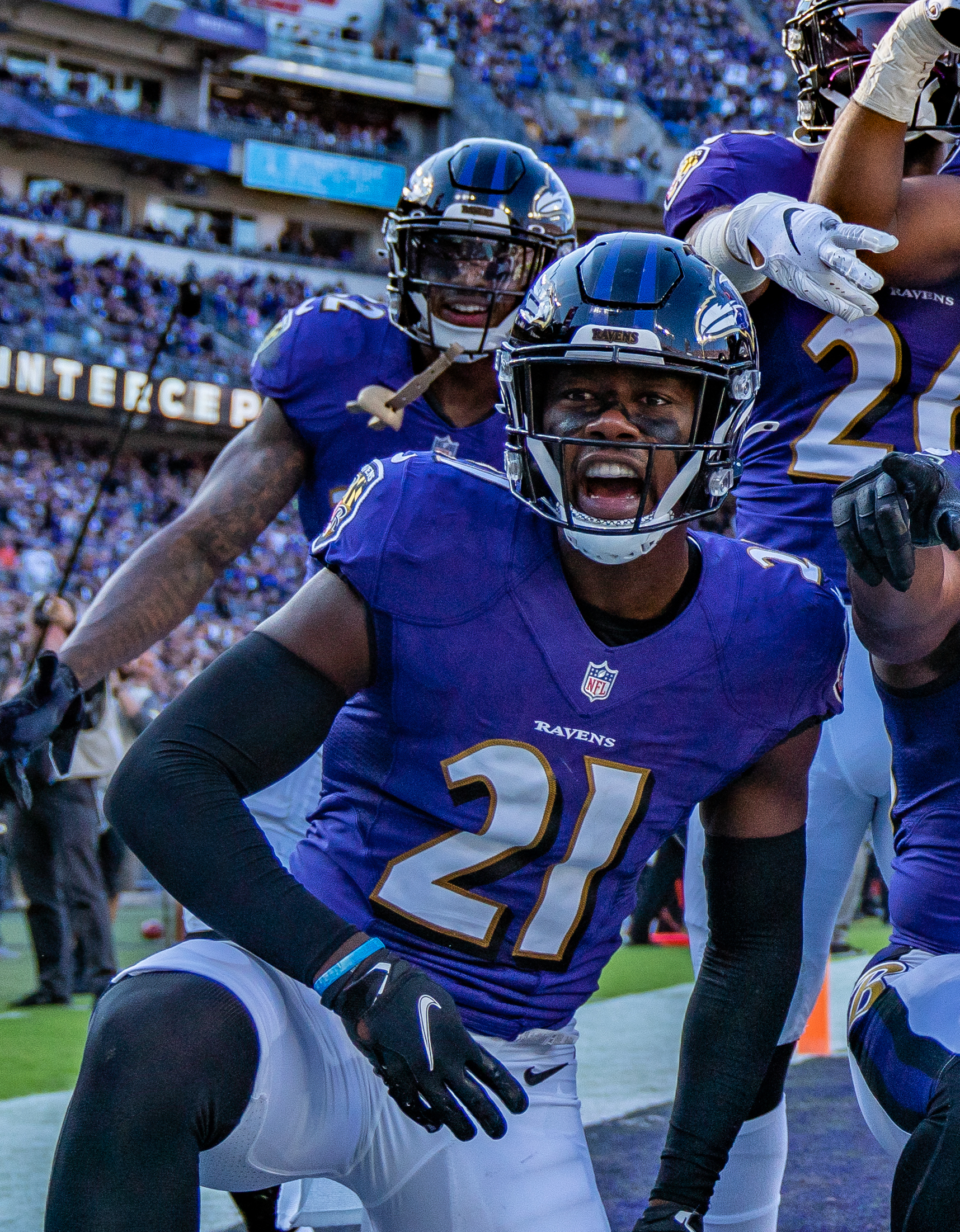
- Stephens with the Baltimore Ravens in 2021

No. 21 – New York Jets
- Position: Cornerback
- Roster status: Active

Personal information
- Born: December 29, 1997 (age 28); Plano, Texas, U.S.
- Listed height: 6 ft 1 in (1.85 m)
- Listed weight: 215 lb (98 kg)

Career information
- High school: Plano Senior
- College: UCLA (2016–2018); SMU (2019–2020)
- NFL draft: 2021: 3rd round, 104th overall pick

Career history
- Baltimore Ravens (2021–2024); New York Jets (2025–present)

Career NFL statistics as of Week 7, 2026
- Total tackles: 351
- Sacks: 2.0
- Forced fumbles: 1
- Fumble recoveries: 1
- Pass deflections: 47
- Interceptions: 2
- Stats at Pro Football Reference

Timothy Brandon Stephens (born December 29, 1997) is an American professional football cornerback for the New York Jets of the National Football League (NFL). He played college football for the UCLA Bruins and SMU Mustangs.

== Early life ==
Stephens grew up in Plano, Texas and attended Plano Senior High School. As a senior, he rushed for 1,389 yards and 15 touchdowns and was named All-State. Stephens initially committed to play college football at Stanford, but decommitted and ultimately chose to play at UCLA.

== College career ==
Stephens began his collegiate career at UCLA, where he played running back. After playing in only two games as a junior and graduating in three years, Stephens announced that he would be leaving the program.

Stephens transferred to SMU and was eligible to play immediately as a graduate transfer. During the offseason, SMU's coaching staff moved him to the cornerback position after a conversation with head coach Sonny Dykes. Stephens became a starter going into his first season with the team and led SMU with 12 passes broken up. As a redshirt senior, he recorded 43 tackles with 10 passes broken up and one interception.

== Professional career ==
=== Pre-draft ===
Pre-draft measurables
Height	Weight	Arm length	Hand span	Wingspan	40-yard dash	10-yard split	20-yard split	20-yard shuttle	Three-cone drill	Vertical jump	Broad jump	Bench press
6 ft 0 1/8 in (1.83 m)	213 lb (97 kg)	32 in (0.81 m)	9 3/4 in (0.25 m)	6 ft 4 3/4 in (1.95 m)	4.44 s	1.62 s	2.57 s	4.29 s	6.99 s	38.0 in (0.97 m)	10 ft 7 in (3.23 m)	19 reps
All values from Pro Day

=== Baltimore Ravens ===
The Baltimore Ravens selected Stephens in the third round (104th overall) of the 2021 NFL draft. He was the 16th cornerback drafted in 2021. Following the conclusion of the second day of the draft, Ravens' General Manager Eric DeCosta told reporters that he viewed Stephens as a safety in the NFL.

External videos
- Ravens select Brandon Stephens No. 104
- Brandon Stephens gets the draft call

==== 2021 season ====
On July 21, 2021, the Baltimore Ravens signed Stephens to a four-year, $4.78 million contract that includes a signing bonus of $840,620.

Throughout training camp, Stephens transitioned to safety and competed for a role as a backup against Jordan Richards, Anthony Levine, and Geno Stone. Defensive coordinator Don Martindale wanted to potentially use Stephens as a hybrid defensive back and had him play safety, nickel, and outside corner in camp. Head coach John Harbaugh named Stephens the primary backup safety, placing him third on the depth chart behind established starters DeShon Elliott and Chuck Clark.

On September 13, 2021, Stephens made his professional regular season debut in the Ravens' 33–27 season-opening loss at the Las Vegas Raiders and made two solo tackles. On October 3, 2021, he earned his first career start in place of starting free safety DeShon Elliott, who was sidelined due to a quadriceps injury. Stephens recorded three combined tackles (one solo) in a 23–7 victory at the Denver Broncos. The following week, Stephens collected a season-high 11 combined tackles (six solo) in a 31–25 win against the Indianapolis Colts in Week 4. On November 8, 2021, the Baltimore Ravens officially placed DeShon Elliott on injured reserve for the remainder of the season due to a biceps/pectoral injury and subsequently named Stephens as the starting free safety. He finished his rookie season in 2021 with a total of 74 combined tackles (39 solo) and four pass deflections in 17 games and 11 starts.

==== 2022 season ====
On January 22, 2022, the Baltimore Ravens parted ways with defensive coordinator Don Martindale and hired Michigan defensive coordinator Mike Macdonald as his successor. Macdonald elected to move Stephens from safety back to cornerback after safety Kyle Hamilton was drafted. In training camp, he competed to be the primary backup cornerback against Kyle Fuller, Jalyn Armour-Davis, and Damarion Williams. Head coach John Harbaugh named Stephens the fourth cornerback on the depth chart to begin the 2022 NFL season, behind Marlon Humphrey, Marcus Peters, and Kyle Fuller.

Prior to Week 4, Stephens was promoted to the third cornerback after Kyle Fuller and Jalyn Armour-Davis were both placed on injured reserve. On October 2, 2022, Stephens started at nickelback for the first time in his career and recorded four solo tackles in a 23–20 loss to the Buffalo Bills. In Week 16, Stephens started at cornerback after Marcus Peters suffered a calf injury and made five combined tackles (three solo) and earned his first career sack on Desmond Ridder with teammate Patrick Queen in a 17–9 win over the Atlanta Falcons. On January 8, 2022, Stephens was hospitalized in Cincinnati due to an acute illness and was subsequently absent for a 27–16 loss at the Cincinnati Bengals. He finished the season with 37 combined tackles (31 solo), seven pass deflections, and a half a sack in 15 games and four starts.

==== 2023 season ====
During training camp, Stephens competed to fill the vacancy as the second starting cornerback against Kyu Blu Kelly, Jalyn Armour-Davis, Damarion Williams, Trayvon Mullen, and Ar'Darius Washington. Head coach John Harbaugh named Stephens and Ronald Darby the starting cornerbacks to start the regular season after Marlon Humphrey underwent surgery for a foot injury.

On September 10, 2023, Stephens started at cornerback and collected a career-high 12 combined tackles (eight solo) during a 25–9 victory against the Houston Texans. On October 1, 2023, Stephens made two solo tackles, a pass deflection, and had his first career interception on a pass attempt by Dorian Thompson-Robinson intended for Amari Cooper and returned it for 52-yards in a 28–3 win at the Cleveland Browns. In Week 8, he recorded seven combined tackles (six solo), deflected a pass, and intercepted a pass by Joshua Dobbs thrown to Michael Wilson in a 31–24 win at the Arizona Cardinals. He was inactive during a Week 17 victory against the Miami Dolphins due to an ankle injury. He ended the 2023 NFL season with a total of 74 combined tackles (57 solo), 11 pass deflections, and two interceptions in 16 games and 16 starts.

The Baltimore Ravens finished first in the AFC North with a 13–4 record to clinch a first round bye. On January 20, 2024, Stephens earned a start in his first career playoff game and made three combined tackles (two solo) as the Ravens defeated the Houston Texans 34–10 in the AFC Divisional Round. The following week, he recorded nine combined tackles (six solo) in a 17–10 loss to the eventual Super Bowl LVIII champions the Kansas City Chiefs in the AFC Championship.

==== 2024 season ====
During training camp, Stephens saw competition for his starting role from rookie Nate Wiggins. Newly appointed defensive coordinator Zachary Orr elected to retain Stephens and Marlon Humphrey as the starting cornerback duo to start 2024. In Week 5, he collected a season-high of nine combined tackles (eight solo) during a 41–38 win against the Cincinnati Bengals. In Week 12, Stephens had three combined tackles (two solo) and was credited with the first full sack of his career on Justin Herbert in a 30–23 win at the Los Angeles Chargers. He started all 17 games in 2024, while amassing a total 70 combined tackles (59 solo), ten pass deflections, and 1.5 sacks.

=== New York Jets ===
On March 13, 2025, Stephens signed a three-year, $36 million contract with the New York Jets.

== NFL career statistics ==
Legend
**Bold**	Career high

=== Regular season ===
Year	Team	Games		Tackles					Interceptions					Fumbles			
Year	Team	GP	GS	Cmb	Solo	Ast	Sck	TFL	PD	Int	Yds	Avg	TD	FF	FR	Yds	TD
2021	BAL	17	11	**78**	49	**29**	0.0	1	4	0	0	0.0	0	0	0	0	0
2022	BAL	15	4	37	31	6	0.5	0	7	0	0	0.0	0	0	0	0	0
2023	BAL	16	16	74	57	17	0.0	2	**11**	**2**	**56**	**28.0**	0	0	0	0	0
2024	BAL	17	17	70	**59**	11	**1.5**	3	10	0	0	0.0	0	0	0	0	0
2025	NYJ	16	16	73	47	26	0.0	**4**	9	0	0	0.0	0	**1**	0	0	0
Career		81	64	332	243	89	2.0	10	41	2	56	28.0	0	1	0	0	0

=== Postseason ===
Year	Team	Games		Tackles					Interceptions					Fumbles			
Year	Team	GP	GS	Cmb	Solo	Ast	Sck	TFL	PD	Int	Yds	Avg	TD	FF	FR	Yds	TD
2023	BAL	2	2	**12**	**8**	**4**	0.0	0	0	0	0	0.0	0	0	0	0	0
2024	BAL	2	2	5	2	3	0.0	0	0	0	0	0.0	0	0	0	0	0
Career		4	4	17	10	7	0.0	0	0	0	0	0.0	0	0	0	0	0
