= 2022 Baltimore Ravens season =

27th season in franchise history

- Owner: Steve Bisciotti
- General manager: Eric DeCosta
- Head coach: John Harbaugh
- Offensive coordinator: Greg Roman
- Defensive coordinator: Mike Macdonald
- Home stadium: M&T Bank Stadium

Results
- Record: 10–7
- Division place: 2nd AFC North
- Playoffs: Lost Wild Card Playoffs (at Bengals) 17–24
- All-Pros: 3: LB Roquan Smith (1st team); K Justin Tucker (2nd team); LS Nick Moore (2nd team)
- Pro Bowlers: 7: QB Tyler Huntley; FB Patrick Ricard; TE Mark Andrews; MLB Roquan Smith; CB Marlon Humphrey; K Justin Tucker; RS Devin Duvernay
- Team MVP: LB Roquan Smith

Uniform
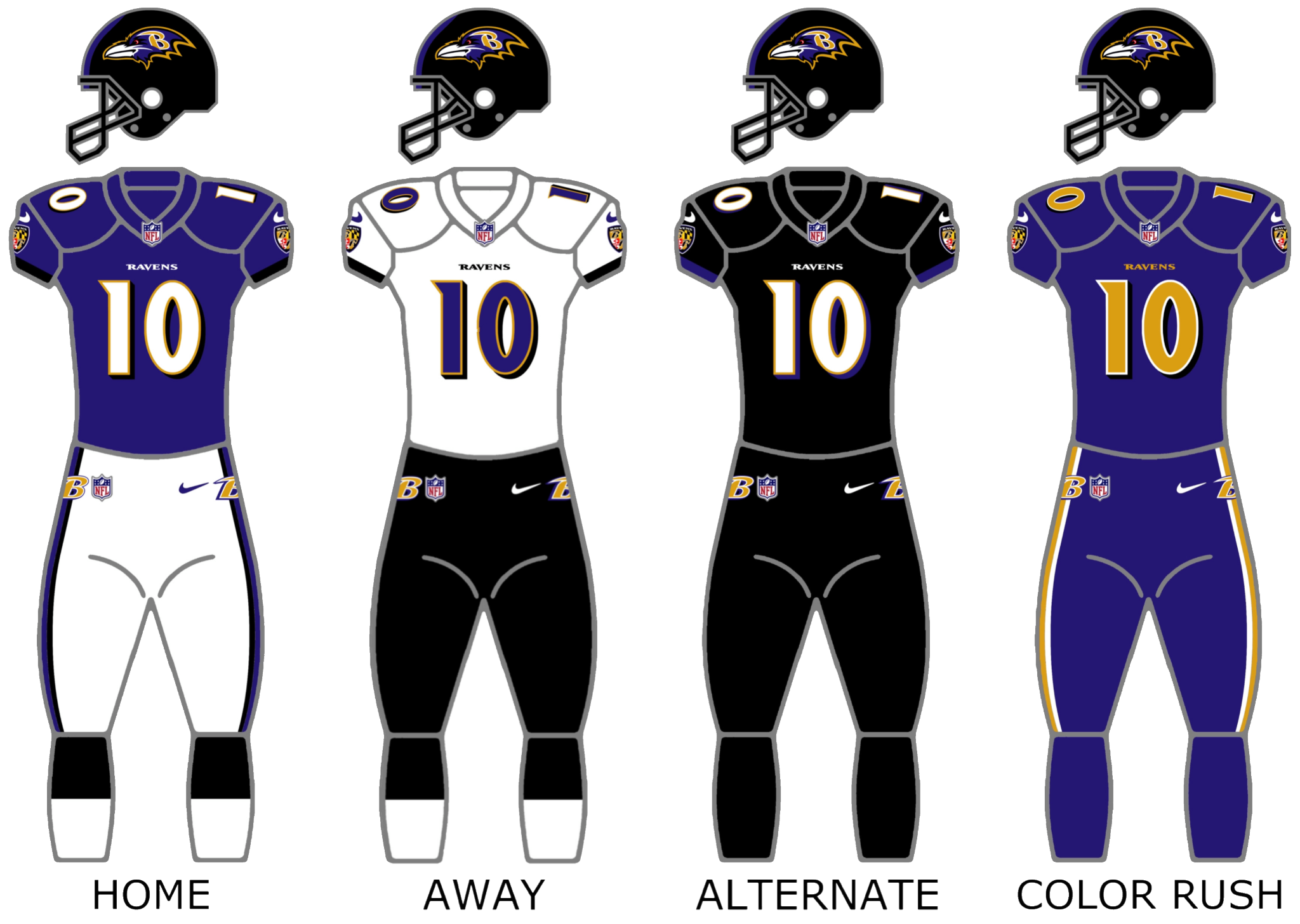

The 2022 season was the Baltimore Ravens' 27th in the National Football League (NFL) and their 15th under head coach John Harbaugh. They improved on their 8–9 record from the previous season and qualified for the postseason after missing the playoffs the previous season.

The Ravens' three preseason victories extended their preseason winning streak to 23 games, which is an NFL record. The Ravens also held double-digit leads in their first 10 games of the season (they would have only three after that). However, this was also the first season in franchise history that the Ravens went the entire season without scoring a defensive touchdown.

Injuries on offense again plagued the Ravens for the second straight year, despite it resulting in a playoff appearance. RBs Gus Edwards and J. K. Dobbins missed time during the season, WR Rashod Bateman sustained a season-ending injury in Week 8, and WR Devin Duvernay also sustained a season-ending injury late in the season. QB Lamar Jackson also suffered a knee injury in Week 13. Although it was initially expected to be a short-term injury, he missed the rest of the season. The offense was severely hampered with backup Tyler Huntley under center and the Ravens did not score more than 17 points in any game he started, although Huntley was selected to the Pro Bowl as an injury replacement. The Ravens also had trouble closing out games; they blew four games where they led by at least ten points, including three in the first six weeks of the season; two of which were by 17 or more points. Even the Ravens' mascot, Poe, suffered a torn ACL while competing against youth football players at halftime of the Commanders preseason game. Poe was replaced by his brothers, former Ravens mascots, Edgar and Allan.

Without Lamar under center, the Ravens suffered a 24–17 loss to the division rival Cincinnati Bengals in the Wild Card round, ending their season. This marked the first time the Ravens lost in the Wild Card round on the road after previously going 6–0 in such games.

== Offseason ==
=== Players added ===
Position	Player	Tag	2021 Team	Date
FS	Marcus Williams	UFA	New Orleans Saints	March 15
OT	Morgan Moses	UFA	New York Jets	March 15
DT	Michael Pierce	UFA	Minnesota Vikings	March 17
RB	Mike Davis	UFA	Atlanta Falcons	May 10
OLB	Vince Biegel	UFA	Miami Dolphins	May 16
DT	Brent Urban	UFA	Dallas Cowboys	May 20
CB	Kyle Fuller	UFA	Denver Broncos	May 24
OLB	Steven Means	UFA	Atlanta Falcons	June 17
OLB	Trent Harris	UFA	New York Giants	August 13
WR	Demarcus Robinson	UFA	Las Vegas Raiders	August 23
RB	Kenyan Drake	UFA	Las Vegas Raiders	August 31
ILB	Del'Shawn Phillips	UFA	New York Jets	August 31

=== Players lost ===
Position	Player	Tag	2022 Team	Date
SS	Anthony Levine	UFA	Retired	January 26
CB	Tavon Young	Waived	Chicago Bears	March 9
OT	Alejandro Villanueva	Waived	Retired	March 9
TE	Eric Tomlinson	UFA	Denver Broncos	March 15
CB	Anthony Averett	UFA	Las Vegas Raiders	March 16
C	Bradley Bozeman	UFA	Carolina Panthers	March 18
QB	Josh Johnson	UFA	Denver Broncos	March 18
LB	Chris Board	UFA	Detroit Lions	March 21
DT	Justin Ellis	UFA	New York Giants	March 23
CB	Chris Westry	UFA	Carolina Panthers	April 4
FS	DeShon Elliott	UFA	Detroit Lions	April 13
WR	Sammy Watkins	UFA	Green Bay Packers	April 14
WR	Miles Boykin	Waived	Pittsburgh Steelers	April 18
WR	Marquise Brown	Traded	Arizona Cardinals	April 28
RB	Ty'Son Williams	UFA	Indianapolis Colts	May 10
DT	Xavier Kelly	Waived		May 11
CB	Khalil Dorsey	UFA	New York Giants	May 18
P	Sam Koch	N/A	Retired	May 19
CB	Kevin Toliver	Waived		May 26
DE	Derek Wolfe	Waived/Injured	Retired	June 14
CB	Iman Marshall	Waived		July 23
SS	Tony Jefferson	Waived	New York Giants	August 29
OG	Tyre Phillips	Waived	New York Giants	August 31

=== Draft ===
2022 Baltimore Ravens Draft
Round	Selection	Player	Position	College	Notes
1	14	Kyle Hamilton	S	Notre Dame	
1	23	Traded to Buffalo (Note: The Ravens traded their first-round selection (23rd overall) to the Buffalo Bills in exchange for first- and fourth-round selections (25th and 130th overall).)			from Arizona (Note: The Ravens traded WR Marquise Brown and a third-round selection (100th overall) to the Arizona Cardinals in exchange for a first-round selection (23rd overall).)
1	25	Tyler Linderbaum	C	Iowa	from Buffalo
2	45	David Ojabo	OLB	Michigan	
3	76	Travis Jones	DT	UConn	
3	100	Traded to Arizona			2020 Resolution JC-2A selection (Note: The Ravens received a Resolution JC-2A third-round selection (100th overall) as compensation for assistant head coach and passing game coordinator David Culley being hired as the head coach of the Houston Texans.)
4	110	Daniel Faalele	OT	Minnesota	from NY Giants (Note: The Ravens traded G Ben Bredeson, a fifth-round selection (173rd overall), and a 2023 seventh-round selection to the New York Giants in exchange for a fourth-round selection (110th overall).)
4	119	Jalyn Armour-Davis	CB	Alabama	
4	128	Charlie Kolar	TE	Iowa State	from Arizona (Note: The Ravens traded 2021 fourth- and sixth-round selections to the Arizona Cardinals in exchange for a fourth-round selection (128th overall).)
4	130	Jordan Stout	P	Penn State	from Buffalo
4	139	Isaiah Likely	TE	Coastal Carolina	Compensatory selection
4	141	Damarion Williams	CB	Houston	Compensatory selection
5	156	Traded to Minnesota (Note: The Ravens traded a conditional fifth-round selection (156th overall) and a 2021 third-round selection to the Minnesota Vikings in exchange for DE Yannick Ngakoue. The fifth-round pick would have become a fourth-round pick if Ngakoue was selected on the first ballot to the 2021 Pro Bowl (not as an alternate). However, this condition was not met.)			
5	173	Traded to the New York Giants			from Kansas City (Note: The Ravens traded OT Orlando Brown Jr, a sixth-round selection (191st overall) and a 2021 second-round selection to the Kansas City Chiefs in exchange for a fifth-round selection (173rd overall), and 2021 first-, third- and fourth-round selections.)
6	191	Traded to Kansas City			
6	196	Tyler Badie	RB	Missouri	from Miami (Note: The Ravens traded C Greg Mancz and a seventh-round selection (224th overall) to the Miami Dolphins in exchange for a sixth-round selection (196th overall).)
7	224	Traded to Miami			from Houston via New England (Note: The Ravens traded CB Shaun Wade to the New England Patriots in exchange for a seventh-round selection (224th overall) and a 2023 fifth-round selection.)
7	235	Traded to Jacksonville (Note: The Ravens traded a conditional seventh-round selection (235th overall) to the Jacksonville Jaguars in exchange for TE Josh Oliver. The trade was conditional on Oliver making Baltimore's roster in 2021.)			

Draft trades

=== Undrafted free agents ===
2022 Baltimore Ravens undrafted free agents
Name	Position	College	Ref.
Slade Bolden	WR	Alabama	
Shemar Bridges	WR	Fort Valley State	
Anthony Brown	QB	Oregon	
Trevor Clark	WR	California	
Diego Fagot	LB	Navy	
Aron Johnson	OT	South Dakota State	
Zakoby McClain	LB	Auburn	
Jeremiah Moon	LB	Florida	
Chris Moore	S	Georgia State	
Rayshad Nichols	DT	Stephen F. Austin	
Ricky Person	RB	NC State	
Makai Polk	WR	Mississippi State	
Josh Ross	LB	Michigan	
David Vereen	CB	Newberry	
Raleigh Webb	WR	The Citadel	
Chuck Wiley	LB	UTSA	
Denzel Williams	CB	Villanova	
Devon Williams	WR	Oregon	

== Trades ==
Position	Player	Traded From	Traded for	Date	Source
ILB	Roquan Smith	Chicago Bears	2023 2nd & 5th Round Picks; ILB A. J. Klein	October 31	

== Staff ==
=== Coaching changes ===
2022 Baltimore Ravens Staff Changes
Coach	Position	Reason left	Replacement
Don Martindale	Defensive coordinator	Fired	Mike Macdonald
Bobby Engram	Tight ends	Accepted job at Wisconsin	George Godsey
Rob Ryan	Inside linebackers	Fired	Zach Orr
Drew Wilkins	Outside linebackers	Accepted same position with New York Giants	Rob Leonard
N/A	Defensive quality control	N/A (position created)	Ryan Osborn
Dick Cass	President	Retired	Sashi Brown
Richard Angulo	Assistant offensive line coach	Accepted job with Jacksonville Jaguars	Mike Devlin
Ron Medlin	Head athletic trainer	Fired	Adrian Dixon

2022 Baltimore Ravens staff
Front office: Owner – Steve Bisciotti; President – Sashi Brown; Executive vice president/general manager – Eric DeCosta; Executive vice president – Ozzie Newsome; Senior vice president of football operations – Pat Moriarty; Director of player personnel – Joe Hortiz; Director of player personnel – George Kokinis; Assistant director of player personnel – Mark Azevedo; Director of college scouting – David Blackburn; Senior player personnel executive – Vince Newsome; Vice president of football administration – Nick Matteo; Director of compliance – Jessica Markison; Head coaches: Head coach – John Harbaugh; Associate head coach/defensive line – Anthony Weaver; Offensive coaches: Offensive coordinator – Greg Roman; Quarterbacks – James Urban; Assistant quarterbacks – Kerry Dixon; Running backs – Craig Ver Steeg; Wide receivers – Tee Martin; Tight ends – George Godsey; Offensive line – Joe D'Alessandris; Assistant offensive line – Mike Devlin; Pass game specialist – Keith Williams; Offensive assistant – Daniel Stern; Offensive assistant – Travis Switzer	Defensive coaches: Defensive coordinator – Mike Macdonald; Outside linebackers – Rob Leonard; Inside linebackers – Zachary Orr; Pass game coordinator/secondary – Chris Hewitt; Safeties – D'Anton Lynn; Defensive assistant – Ryan Osborn; Defensive assistant – Jay Peterson; Defensive assistant – Matt Robinson; Special teams coaches: Special teams coordinator – Chris Horton; Special teams – Randy Brown; Special teams – T. J. Weist; Strength and conditioning: Head strength and conditioning – Steve Saunders; Assistant strength and conditioning – Scott Elliott; Assistant strength and conditioning – Ron Shrift; Assistant strength and conditioning – Anthony Watson; Football performance – Sam Rosengarten

== Final roster ==
2022 Baltimore Ravens roster
Quarterbacks (QB): 12 Anthony Brown; 2 Tyler Huntley; 8 Lamar Jackson; Running backs (RB): 27 J. K. Dobbins; 17 Kenyan Drake; 35 Gus Edwards; 43 Justice Hill; 42 Patrick Ricard; Wide receivers (WR): 11 James Proche; 10 Demarcus Robinson; 82 Sammy Watkins; Tight ends (TE): 89 Mark Andrews; 88 Charlie Kolar; 80 Isaiah Likely; 84 Josh Oliver	Offensive linemen (OL): 66 Ben Cleveland G; 63 Trystan Colon G/C; 77 Daniel Faalele T; 64 Tyler Linderbaum C; 65 Patrick Mekari T; 78 Morgan Moses T; 72 Ben Powers G; 79 Ronnie Stanley T; 70 Kevin Zeitler G; Defensive linemen (DL): 93 Calais Campbell DE; 98 Travis Jones NT; 92 Justin Madubuike DE; 68 Brent Urban DE; 96 Broderick Washington NT	Linebackers (LB): 54 Tyus Bowser OLB; 40 Malik Harrison OLB; 50 Justin Houston OLB; 90 David Ojabo OLB; 99 Odafe Oweh OLB; 53 Del'Shawn Phillips ILB; 4 Jason Pierre-Paul OLB; 6 Patrick Queen ILB; 18 Roquan Smith ILB; 57 Kristian Welch ILB; Defensive backs (DB): 36 Chuck Clark SS; 14 Kyle Hamilton SS/FS; 44 Marlon Humphrey CB; 24 Marcus Peters CB; 25 Kevon Seymour CB; 21 Brandon Stephens CB; 26 Geno Stone FS; 29 Ar'Darius Washington FS; 22 Damarion Williams CB; 32 Marcus Williams FS; 41 Daryl Worley CB; Special teams (ST): 46 Nick Moore LS; 11 Jordan Stout P; 9 Justin Tucker K	Practice squad: 11 Tarik Black WR; 86 Nick Boyle TE; 85 Shemar Bridges WR; 56 Josh Bynes ILB; 5 Brett Hundley QB; 83 Andy Isabella WR; 33 BoPete Keyes CB; 38 Ben Mason FB; 69 Kahlil McKenzie G; 48 Jeremiah Moon OLB; 91 Rayshad Nichols DE; 74 David Sharpe T; 76 John Simpson G; 87 Mike Thomas WR; 81 Binjimen Victor WR; Reserve: 5 Jalyn Armour-Davis CB; 12 Rashod Bateman WR; 47 Vince Biegel OLB; 13 Devin Duvernay WR; 18 Kyle Fuller CB; 59 Daelin Hayes OLB; 71 Ja'Wuan James T; 60 Steven Means OLB; 58 Michael Pierce NT; 46 Josh Ross ILB; 16 Tylan Wallace WR; Rookies in italics 53 active, 11 reserve, 15 practice squad

== Preseason ==
The Ravens' preseason opponents and schedule were announced in the spring.

Week	Date	Opponent	Result	Record	Venue	Recap
1	August 11	Tennessee Titans	W 23–10	1–0	M&T Bank Stadium	Recap
2	August 21	at Arizona Cardinals	W 24–17	2–0	State Farm Stadium	Recap
3	August 27	Washington Commanders	W 17–15	3–0	M&T Bank Stadium	Recap

== Regular season ==
=== Schedule ===
Week	Date	Opponent	Result	Record	Venue	Recap
1	September 11	at New York Jets	**W** 24–9	1–0	MetLife Stadium	Recap
2	September 18	Miami Dolphins	**L** 38–42	1–1	M&T Bank Stadium	Recap
3	September 25	at New England Patriots	**W** 37–26	2–1	Gillette Stadium	Recap
4	October 2	Buffalo Bills	**L** 20–23	2–2	M&T Bank Stadium	Recap
5	October 9	**Cincinnati Bengals**	**W** 19–17	3–2	M&T Bank Stadium	Recap
6	October 16	at New York Giants	**L** 20–24	3–3	MetLife Stadium	Recap
7	October 23	**Cleveland Browns**	**W** 23–20	4–3	M&T Bank Stadium	Recap
8	October 27	at Tampa Bay Buccaneers	**W** 27–22	5–3	Raymond James Stadium	Recap
9	November 7	at New Orleans Saints	**W** 27–13	6–3	Caesars Superdome	Recap
10	Bye					
11	November 20	Carolina Panthers	**W** 13–3	7–3	M&T Bank Stadium	Recap
12	November 27	at Jacksonville Jaguars	**L** 27–28	7–4	TIAA Bank Field	Recap
13	December 4	Denver Broncos	**W** 10–9	8–4	M&T Bank Stadium	Recap
14	December 11	at **Pittsburgh Steelers**	**W** 16–14	9–4	Acrisure Stadium	Recap
15	December 17	at **Cleveland Browns**	**L** 3–13	9–5	FirstEnergy Stadium	Recap
16	December 24	Atlanta Falcons	**W** 17–9	10–5	M&T Bank Stadium	Recap
17	January 1	**Pittsburgh Steelers**	**L** 13–16	10–6	M&T Bank Stadium	Recap
18	January 8	at **Cincinnati Bengals**	**L** 16–27	10–7	Paycor Stadium	Recap

Note: Intra-division opponents are in bold text.

=== Game summaries ===
==== Week 1: Baltimore Ravens 24, New York Jets 9 ====
Week 1: Baltimore Ravens at New York Jets – Game summary

Quarter	1	2	3	4	Total
**Ravens**	3	7	14	0	**24**
Jets	0	3	0	6	**9**

at MetLife Stadium, East Rutherford, New Jersey

- Date: September 11
- Game time: 1:00 p.m. EDT
- Game weather: Rain, 73 °F (23 °C)
- Game attendance: 78,827
- Referee: Craig Wrolstad
- TV announcers (CBS): Andrew Catalon, James Lofton, and Michael Grady
- Recap, Game Book

Game information

**First quarter**

- BAL – Justin Tucker 24-yard field goal, 3:16. Ravens 3–0. **Drive: 4 plays, 7 yards, 1:30.**

**Second quarter**

- BAL – Devin Duvernay 25-yard pass from Lamar Jackson (Justin Tucker kick), 3:45. Ravens 10–0. **Drive: 3 plays, 62 yards, 0:56.**
- NYJ – Greg Zuerlein 45-yard field goal, 0:24. Ravens 10–3. **Drive: 8 plays, 48 yards, 3:21.**

**Third quarter**

- BAL – Devin Duvernay 17-yard pass from Lamar Jackson (Justin Tucker kick), 7:14. Ravens 17–3. **Drive: 6 plays, 44 yards, 3:10.**
- BAL – Rashod Bateman 55-yard pass from Lamar Jackson (Justin Tucker kick), 2:06. Ravens 24–3. **Drive: 5 plays, 88 yards, 2:31.**

**Fourth quarter**

- NYJ – Tyler Conklin 3-yard pass from Joe Flacco (kick failed), 1:00. Ravens 24–9. **Drive: 11 plays, 43 yards, 1:42.**

**Top passers**

- BAL – Lamar Jackson – 17/30, 213 yards, 3 TD, INT
- NYJ – Joe Flacco – 37/59, 307 yards, TD, INT

**Top rushers**

- BAL – Kenyan Drake – 11 rushes, 31 yards
- NYJ – Michael Carter – 10 rushes, 60 yards

**Top receivers**

- BAL – Rashod Bateman – 2 receptions, 59 yards, TD
- NYJ – Corey Davis – 6 receptions, 77 yards

After a somewhat slow start, the Ravens outscored the Jets, who were led by former Ravens QB Joe Flacco, 21–3 in the 2nd and 3rd quarters en route to a 24–9 season opening victory. Lamar Jackson threw for 213 yards, three touchdowns, and an interception; the first two touchdowns went to Devin Duvernay while the third one was caught by Rashod Bateman. With the win, the Ravens started the season 1–0 and snapped a six-game losing streak which dated back to Week 12 of the previous season.

==== Week 2: Miami Dolphins 42, Baltimore Ravens 38 ====
Week 2: Miami Dolphins at Baltimore Ravens – Game summary

Quarter	1	2	3	4	Total
**Dolphins**	0	7	7	28	**42**
Ravens	7	21	7	3	**38**

at M&T Bank Stadium, Baltimore, Maryland

- Date: September 18
- Game time: 1:00 p.m. EDT
- Game weather: Sunny, 82 °F (28 °C)
- Game attendance: 70,582
- Referee: Adrian Hill
- TV announcers (CBS): Kevin Harlan, Trent Green, and Melanie Collins
- Recap, Game Book

Game information

**First quarter**

- BAL – Devin Duvernay 103-yard kick off return (Justin Tucker kick), 14:47. Ravens 7–0.

**Second quarter**

- MIA – Jaylen Waddle 6-yard pass from Tua Tagovailoa (Jason Sanders kick), 10:54. Tied 7–7. **Drive: 6 plays, 94 yards, 3:49.**
- BAL – Rashod Bateman 75-yard pass from Lamar Jackson (Justin Tucker kick), 10:44. Ravens 14–7. **Drive: 1 play, 75 yards, 0:10.**
- BAL – Mark Andrews 1-yard pass from Lamar Jackson (Justin Tucker kick), 4:03. Ravens 21–7. **Drive: 6 plays, 66 yards, 2:43.**
- BAL – Demarcus Robinson 12-yard pass from Lamar Jackson (Justin Tucker kick), 0:29. Ravens 28–7. **Drive: 6 plays, 80 yards, 0:51.**

**Third quarter**

- MIA – Mike Gesicki 14-yard pass from Tua Tagovailoa (Jason Sanders kick), 7:52. Ravens 28–14. **Drive: 12 plays, 75 yards, 7:08.**
- BAL – Lamar Jackson 79-yard run (Justin Tucker kick), 0:26. Ravens 35–14. **Drive: 3 plays, 87 yards, 1:34.**

**Fourth quarter**

- MIA – River Cracraft 2-yard pass from Tua Tagovailoa (Jason Sanders kick), 12:12. Ravens 35–21. **Drive: 7 plays, 75 yards, 3:14.**
- MIA – Tyreek Hill 48-yard pass from Tua Tagovailoa (Jason Sanders kick), 7:47. Ravens 35–28. **Drive: 5 plays, 59 yards, 1:24.**
- MIA – Tyreek Hill 60-yard pass from Tua Tagovailoa (Jason Sanders kick), 5:19. Tied 35–35. **Drive: 3 plays, 64 yards, 1:27.**
- BAL – Justin Tucker 51-yard field goal, 2:18. Ravens 38–35. **Drive: 6 plays, 42 yards, 3:01.**
- MIA – Jaylen Waddle 7-yard pass from Tua Tagovailoa (Jason Sanders kick), 0:14. Dolphins 42–38. **Drive: 6 plays, 68 yards, 2:04.**

**Top passers**

- MIA – Tua Tagovailoa – 36/50, 469 yards, 6 TD, 2 INT
- BAL – Lamar Jackson – 21/29, 318 yards, 3 TD

**Top rushers**

- MIA – Raheem Mostert – 11 rushes, 51 yards
- BAL – Lamar Jackson – 9 rushes, 119 yards, TD

**Top receivers**

- MIA – Tyreek Hill – 11 receptions, 190 yards, 2 TD
- BAL – Rashod Bateman – 4 receptions, 108 yards, TD

In what would be a recurring theme for their 2022 season, the Ravens blew a 35–14 lead and lost to Tua Tagovailoa and the Dolphins, 42–38, on a 7-yard touchdown pass from Tagovailoa to Jaylen Waddle with just 14 seconds left. Jackson threw for 318 yards, three touchdowns, and rushed for 119 yards and a touchdown and surpassed Michael Vick for the most 100-yard rushing games by a quarterback with his 79-yard touchdown run in the third quarter in a losing effort. With the upset loss, the Ravens fell to 1–1, and lost their second straight game against the Dolphins.

==== Week 3: Baltimore Ravens 37, New England Patriots 26 ====
Week 3: Baltimore Ravens at New England Patriots – Game summary

Quarter	1	2	3	4	Total
**Ravens**	7	7	17	6	**37**
Patriots	0	13	7	6	**26**

at Gillette Stadium, Foxborough, Massachusetts

- Date: September 25
- Game time: 1:00 p.m. EDT
- Game weather: Mostly cloudy, 66 °F (19 °C)
- Game attendance: 65,878
- Referee: Bill Vinovich
- TV announcers (Fox): Joe Davis, Daryl Johnston, and Pam Oliver
- Recap, Game Book

Game information
**First quarter**
- BAL – Mark Andrews 5-yard pass from Lamar Jackson (Justin Tucker kick), 4:09. Ravens 7–0. **Drive: 11 plays, 69 yards, 6:23.**

**Second quarter**

- NE – Nick Folk 35-yard field goal, 14:57. Ravens 7–3. **Drive: 7 plays, 62 yards, 4:12.**
- NE – Mac Jones 3-yard run (Nick Folk kick), 5:58. Patriots 10–7. **Drive: 6 plays, 32 yards, 2:14.**
- BAL – Mark Andrews 16-yard pass from Lamar Jackson (Justin Tucker kick), 0:30. Ravens 14–10. **Drive: 9 plays, 75 yards, 5:28.**
- NE – Nick Folk 50-yard field goal, 0:00. Ravens 14–13. **Drive: 5 plays, 43 yards, 0:30.**

**Third quarter**

- NE – Damien Harris 2-yard run (Nick Folk kick), 12:14. Patriots 20–14. **Drive: 7 plays, 75 yards, 2:46.**
- BAL – Josh Oliver 1-yard pass from Lamar Jackson (Justin Tucker kick), 4:41. Ravens 21–20. **Drive: 7 plays, 75 yards, 3:35.**
- BAL – Devin Duvernay 4-yard pass from Lamar Jackson (Justin Tucker kick), 8:39. Ravens 28–20. **Drive: 4 plays, 44 yards, 1:37.**
- BAL – Justin Tucker 56-yard field goal, 2:33. Ravens 31–20. **Drive: 4 plays, 5 yards, 1:31.**

**Fourth quarter**

- NE – Rhamondre Stevenson 1-yard run (run failed), 12:39. Ravens 31–26. **Drive: 9 plays, 75 yards, 4:54.**
- BAL – Lamar Jackson 9-yard run (kick failed), 3:00. Ravens 37–26. **Drive: 7 plays, 73 yards, 2:35.**

**Top passers**

- BAL – Lamar Jackson – 18/29, 218 yards, 4 TD, INT
- NE – Mac Jones – 22/32, 323 yards, 3 INT

**Top rushers**

- BAL – Lamar Jackson – 11 rushes, 107 yards, TD
- NE – Rhamondre Stevenson – 12 rushes, 73 yards, TD

**Top receivers**

- BAL – Mark Andrews – 8 receptions, 89 yards, 2 TD
- NE – DeVante Parker – 5 receptions, 156 yards

This was the Ravens' first regular season road win in Foxborough, and their first road win against the Patriots since the 2012 AFC Championship game.

==== Week 4: Buffalo Bills 23, Baltimore Ravens 20 ====
Week 4: Buffalo Bills at Baltimore Ravens – Game summary

Quarter	1	2	3	4	Total
**Bills**	3	7	10	3	**23**
Ravens	14	6	0	0	**20**

at M&T Bank Stadium, Baltimore, Maryland

- Date: October 2
- Game time: 1:00 p.m. EDT
- Game weather: Cloudy, showers, 52 °F (11 °C)
- Game attendance: 70,494
- Referee: Jerome Boger
- TV announcers (CBS): Ian Eagle, Charles Davis, and Evan Washburn
- Recap, Game Book

Game information

**First quarter**

- BAL – J. K. Dobbins 1-yard pass from Lamar Jackson (Justin Tucker kick), 13:26. Ravens 7–0. **Drive: 2 plays, 4 yards, 0:42.**
- BUF – Tyler Bass 38-yard field goal, 10:14. Ravens 7–3. **Drive: 8 plays, 37 yards, 2:12.**
- BAL – J. K. Dobbins 4-yard run (Justin Tucker kick), 1:06. Ravens 14–3. **Drive: 15 plays, 81 yards, 9:08.**

**Second quarter**

- BAL – Justin Tucker 42-yard field goal, 12:54. Ravens 17–3. **Drive: 5 plays, 12 yards, 2:26.**
- BAL – Justin Tucker 51-yard field goal, 3:39. Ravens 20–3. **Drive: 11 plays, 38 yards, 7:40.**
- BUF – Isaiah McKenzie 4-yard pass from Josh Allen (Tyler Bass kick), 0:09. Ravens 20–10. **Drive: 11 plays, 76 yards, 1:38.**

**Third quarter**

- BUF – Tyler Bass 39-yard field goal, 9:42. Ravens 20–13. **Drive: 10 plays, 51 yards, 4:07.**
- BUF – Josh Allen 11-yard run (Tyler Bass kick), 3:26. Tied 20–20. **Drive: 9 plays, 80 yards, 3:27.**

**Fourth quarter**

- BUF – Tyler Bass 21-yard field goal, 0:00. Bills 23–20. **Drive: 12 plays, 77 yards, 4:09.**

**Top passers**

- BUF – Josh Allen – 19/36, 213 yards, TD, INT
- BAL – Lamar Jackson – 20/29, 144 yards, TD, 2 INT

**Top rushers**

- BUF – Josh Allen – 11 rushes, 70 yards, TD
- BAL – Lamar Jackson – 11 rushes, 73 yards

**Top receivers**

- BUF – Stefon Diggs – 4 receptions, 62 yards
- BAL – Devin Duvernay – 4 receptions, 51 yards

The Ravens blew a 20–3 lead and lost to Josh Allen and the Bills, 23–20, on a 21-yard field goal by Tyler Bass. With the loss, the Ravens fell to an even 2–2.

==== Week 5: Baltimore Ravens 19, Cincinnati Bengals 17 ====
Week 5: Cincinnati Bengals at Baltimore Ravens – Game summary

Quarter	1	2	3	4	Total
Bengals	0	10	0	7	**17**
**Ravens**	3	7	3	6	**19**

at M&T Bank Stadium, Baltimore, Maryland

- Date: October 9
- Game time: 8:20 p.m. EDT
- Game weather: Clear, 60 °F (16 °C)
- Game attendance: 70,548
- Referee: Scott Novak
- TV announcers (NBC): Mike Tirico, Cris Collinsworth, and Melissa Stark
- Recap, Game Book

Game information

**First quarter**

- BAL – Justin Tucker 37-yard field goal, 8:03. Ravens 3–0. **Drive: 10 plays, 51 yards, 4:54.**

**Second quarter**

- BAL – Mark Andrews 11-yard pass from Lamar Jackson (Justin Tucker kick), 13:26. Ravens 10–0. **Drive: 7 plays, 50 yards, 2:55.**
- CIN – Hayden Hurst 19-yard pass from Joe Burrow (Evan McPherson kick), 4:54. Ravens 10–7. **Drive: 7 plays, 83 yards, 4:24.**
- CIN – Evan McPherson 40-yard field goal, 0:04. Tied 10–10. **Drive: 11 plays, 62 yards, 1:50.**

**Third quarter**

- BAL – Justin Tucker 58-yard field goal, 10:49. Ravens 13–10. **Drive: 4 plays, 6 yards, 1:35.**

**Fourth quarter**

- BAL – Justin Tucker 25-yard field goal, 9:42. Ravens 16–10. **Drive: 15 plays, 91 yards, 8:03.**
- CIN – Joe Burrow 1-yard run (Evan McPherson kick), 1:58. Bengals 17–16. **Drive: 13 plays, 75 yards, 7:44.**
- BAL – Justin Tucker 43-yard field goal, 0:00. Ravens 19–17. **Drive: 7 plays, 50 yards, 1:58.**

**Top passers**

- CIN – Joe Burrow – 24/35, 217 yards, TD, INT
- BAL – Lamar Jackson – 19/32, 174 yards, TD, INT

**Top rushers**

- CIN – Joe Mixon – 14 rushes, 78 yards
- BAL – Lamar Jackson – 12 rushes, 58 yards

**Top receivers**

- CIN – Hayden Hurst – 6 receptions, 53 yards, TD
- BAL – Mark Andrews – 8 receptions, 89 yards, TD

The Ravens survived another comeback bid as Justin Tucker kicked the game-winning 43-yard field goal as time expired in a 19–17 win over the Bengals. With the win, the Ravens snapped a six-game home losing streak, improved to 3–2, and moved into first place in the AFC North.

==== Week 6: New York Giants 24, Baltimore Ravens 20 ====
Week 6: Baltimore Ravens at New York Giants – Game summary

Quarter	1	2	3	4	Total
Ravens	0	10	3	7	**20**
**Giants**	0	7	3	14	**24**

at MetLife Stadium, East Rutherford, New Jersey

- Date: October 16
- Game time: 1:00 p.m. EDT
- Game weather: Fair, 60 °F (16 °C)
- Game attendance: 78,019
- Referee: Clay Martin
- TV announcers (CBS): Ian Eagle, Charles Davis, and Evan Washburn
- Recap, Game Book

Game information

**First quarter**

- No scoring plays.

**Second quarter**

- BAL – Kenyan Drake 30-yard run (Justin Tucker kick), 9:26. Ravens 7–0. **Drive: 8 plays, 89 yards, 4:08.**
- NYG – Wan'Dale Robinson 5-yard pass from Daniel Jones (Graham Gano kick), 3:31. Tied 7–7. **Drive: 10 plays, 53 yards, 5:55.**
- BAL – Justin Tucker 34-yard field goal, 1:45. Ravens 10–7. **Drive: 8 plays, 59 yards, 1:46.**

**Third quarter**

- BAL – Justin Tucker 23-yard field goal, 9:41. Ravens 13–7. **Drive: 8 plays, 64 yards, 3:12.**
- NYG – Graham Gano 34-yard field goal, 2:00. Ravens 13–10. **Drive: 14 plays, 59 yards, 7:41.**

**Fourth quarter**

- BAL – Mark Andrews 12-yard pass from Lamar Jackson (Justin Tucker kick), 12:54. Ravens 20–10. **Drive: 8 plays, 75 yards, 4:06.**
- NYG – Daniel Bellinger 8-yard pass from Daniel Jones (Graham Gano kick), 6:01. Ravens 20–17. **Drive: 12 plays, 75 yards, 6:53.**
- NYG – Saquon Barkley 1-yard run (Graham Gano kick), 1:43. Giants 24–20. **Drive: 3 plays, 13 yards, 1:07.**

**Top passers**

- BAL – Lamar Jackson – 17/32, 210 yards, TD, INT
- NYG – Daniel Jones – 19/27, 173 yards, 2 TD

**Top rushers**

- BAL – Kenyan Drake – 10 rushes, 119 yards, TD
- NYG – Saquon Barkley – 22 rushes, 83 yards, TD

**Top receivers**

- BAL – Mark Andrews – 7 receptions, 106 yards, TD
- NYG – Daniel Bellinger – 5 receptions, 38 yards, TD

The Ravens blew a 20–10 lead and lost to Daniel Jones and the Giants, 24–20, on a 1-yard touchdown run by Saquon Barkley. With the loss, the Ravens fell to 3–3. They once again failed to win a road game against the Giants, not having done so since the two teams met for the first time in 1997. This was the first time that Lamar Jackson lost to an NFC team, and last until losing at the hands of the Philadelphia Eagles two years later.

==== Week 7: Baltimore Ravens 23, Cleveland Browns 20 ====
Week 7: Cleveland Browns at Baltimore Ravens – Game summary

Quarter	1	2	3	4	Total
Browns	10	0	3	7	**20**
**Ravens**	3	10	7	3	**23**

at M&T Bank Stadium, Baltimore, Maryland

- Date: October 23
- Game time: 1:00 p.m. EDT
- Game weather: Cloudy, 64 °F (18 °C)
- Game attendance: 70,461
- Referee: Shawn Smith
- TV announcers (CBS): Kevin Harlan, Trent Green, and Melanie Collins
- Recap, Game Book

Game information

**First quarter**

- CLE – Nick Chubb 2-yard run (Cade York kick), 8:23. Browns 7–0. **Drive: 11 plays, 75 yards, 6:37.**
- BAL – Justin Tucker 32-yard field goal, 3:27. Browns 7–3. **Drive: 9 plays, 61 yards, 4:56.**
- CLE – Cade York 41-yard field goal, 0:18. Browns 10–3. **Drive: 5 plays, 52 yards, 3:09.**

**Second quarter**

- BAL – Justin Tucker 34-yard field goal, 10:05. Browns 10–6. **Drive: 4 plays, 5 yards, 1:38.**
- BAL – Gus Edwards 7-yard run (Justin Tucker kick), 1:57. Ravens 13–10. **Drive: 10 plays, 80 yards, 6:11.**

**Third quarter**

- BAL – Gus Edwards 1-yard run (Justin Tucker kick), 7:39. Ravens 20–10. **Drive: 8 plays, 25 yards, 4:18.**
- CLE – Cade York 37-yard field goal, 2:40. Ravens 20–13. **Drive: 10 plays, 56 yards, 4:59.**

**Fourth quarter**

- BAL – Justin Tucker 55-yard field goal, 11:24. Ravens 23–13. **Drive: 13 plays, 38 yards, 6:16.**
- CLE – Kareem Hunt 2-yard run (Cade York kick), 9:00. Ravens 23–20. **Drive: 7 plays, 75 yards, 2:24.**

**Top passers**

- CLE – Jacoby Brissett – 22/27, 258 yards
- BAL – Lamar Jackson – 9/16, 120 yards

**Top rushers**

- CLE – Nick Chubb – 16 rushes, 91 yards, TD
- BAL – Gus Edwards – 16 rushes, 66 yards, 2 TD

**Top receivers**

- CIN – Amari Cooper – 3 receptions, 74 yards
- BAL – Devin Duvernay – 2 receptions, 42 yards

The Ravens held off the Browns and remained atop the AFC North with a 23–20 home win. Ravens RB Gus Edwards scored two rushing touchdowns in his first game back from injury since the 2020 postseason and LB Malik Harrison blocked a potential game-tying 60-yard field goal by Cade York in the final two minutes of regulation. With the win, the Ravens improved to 4–3.

==== Week 8: Baltimore Ravens 27, Tampa Bay Buccaneers 22 ====
Week 8: Baltimore Ravens at Tampa Bay Buccaneers – Game summary

Quarter	1	2	3	4	Total
**Ravens**	3	0	14	10	**27**
Buccaneers	10	0	0	12	**22**

at Raymond James Stadium, Tampa, Florida

- Date: October 27
- Game time: 8:20 p.m. EDT
- Game weather: Cloudy, 79 °F (26 °C)
- Game attendance: 68,912
- Referee: Carl Cheffers
- TV announcers (WMAR/Prime Video): Al Michaels, Kirk Herbstreit, and Kaylee Hartung
- Recap, Game Book

Game information

**First quarter**

- BAL – Justin Tucker 22-yard field goal, 11:03. Ravens 3–0. **Drive: 4 plays, 2 yards, 1:34.**
- TB – Leonard Fournette 1-yard run (Ryan Succop kick), 6:56. Buccaneers 7–3. **Drive: 8 plays, 75 yards, 4:07.**
- TB – Ryan Succop 31-yard field goal, 0:26. Buccaneers 10–3. **Drive: 10 plays, 50 yards, 4:41.**

**Second quarter**

- No scoring plays.

**Third quarter**

- BAL – Kenyan Drake 5-yard pass from Lamar Jackson (Justin Tucker kick), 9:05. Tied 10–10. **Drive: 9 plays, 77 yards, 4:53.**
- BAL – Isaiah Likely 10-yard pass from Lamar Jackson (Justin Tucker kick), 0:05. Ravens 17–10. **Drive: 11 plays, 80 yards, 6:52.**

**Fourth quarter**

- TB – Ryan Succop 30-yard field goal, 12:26. Ravens 17–13. **Drive: 8 plays, 63 yards, 2:39.**
- BAL – Devin Duvernay 15-yard run (Justin Tucker kick), 6:55. Ravens 24–13. **Drive: 9 plays, 83 yards, 5:31.**
- TB – Ryan Succop 26-yard field goal, 4:54. Ravens 24–16. **Drive: 9 plays, 67 yards, 2:01.**
- BAL – Justin Tucker 30-yard field goal, 1:45. Ravens 27–16. **Drive: 5 plays, 49 yards, 2:42.**
- TB – Julio Jones 8-yard pass from Tom Brady (run failed), 0:49. Ravens 27–22. **Drive: 11 plays, 75 yards, 1:23.**

**Top passers**

- BAL – Lamar Jackson – 27/38, 238 yards, 2 TD
- TB – Tom Brady – 26/44, 325 yards, TD

**Top rushers**

- BAL – Gus Edwards – 11 rushes, 65 yards
- TB – Leonard Fournette – 9 rushes, 24 yards, TD

**Top receivers**

- BAL – Isaiah Likely – 6 receptions, 77 yards, TD
- TB – Mike Evans – 6 receptions, 123 yards

After a sluggish first half, the Ravens outscored the Buccaneers 24–12 in the second half for 27–22 victory. Lamar Jackson threw for 238 yards and two touchdowns while Gus Edwards ran for 65 yards. However, Edwards would be injured late in the game, causing him to miss the next two games. This would also be the final game of the season for WR Rashod Bateman, who suffered a foot injury, which would require season-ending surgery, in the second quarter.

==== Week 9: Baltimore Ravens 27, New Orleans Saints 13 ====
Week 9: Baltimore Ravens at New Orleans Saints – Game summary

Quarter	1	2	3	4	Total
**Ravens**	7	7	3	10	**27**
Saints	0	3	3	7	**13**

at Caesars Superdome, New Orleans, Louisiana

- Date: November 7
- Game time: 8:15 p.m. EST/7:15 p.m. CST
- Game weather: None (indoor stadium)
- Game attendance: 70,010
- Referee: Brad Rogers
- TV announcers (WJZ-TV/ESPN): Joe Buck, Troy Aikman, and Lisa Salters
- Recap, Game Book

Game information

**First quarter**

- BAL – Isaiah Likely 24-yard pass from Lamar Jackson (Justin Tucker kick), 1:23. Ravens 7–0. **Drive: 11 plays, 76 yards, 7:02.**

**Second quarter**

- BAL – Kenyan Drake 1-yard run (Justin Tucker kick), 2:00. Ravens 14–0. **Drive: 12 plays, 81 yards, 7:05.**
- NO – Wil Lutz 33-yard field goal, 0:00. Ravens 14–3. **Drive: 12 plays, 60 yards, 2:00.**

**Third quarter**

- BAL – Justin Tucker 32-yard field goal, 8:25. Ravens 17–3. **Drive: 12 plays, 61 yards, 6:35.**
- NO – Wil Lutz 37-yard field goal, 1:25. Ravens 17–6. **Drive: 12 plays, 56 yards, 7:00.**

**Fourth quarter**

- BAL – Justin Tucker 41-yard field goal, 8:31. Ravens 20–6. **Drive: 8 plays, 40 yards, 4:39.**
- BAL – Kenyan Drake 3-yard run (Justin Tucker kick), 6:55. Ravens 27–6. **Drive: 3 plays, 17 yards, 1:29.**
- NO – Juwan Johnson 41-yard pass from Andy Dalton (Wil Lutz kick), 4:22. Ravens 27–13. **Drive: 9 plays, 83 yards, 2:42.**

**Top passers**

- BAL – Lamar Jackson – 12/22, 133 yards, TD
- NO – Andy Dalton – 19/29, 210 yards, TD, INT

**Top rushers**

- BAL – Kenyan Drake – 24 rushes, 93 yards, 2 TD
- NO – Alvin Kamara – 9 rushes, 30 yards

**Top receivers**

- BAL – Isaiah Likely – 1 reception, 24 yards, TD
- NO – Chris Olave – 6 receptions, 71 yards

The Ravens used dominating performances by QB Lamar Jackson, RB Kenyan Drake, and their defense en route to 27–13 win over the Saints. Jackson had 133 passing yards and a TD along with 82 rushing yards while Drake had 93 rushing yards and 2 TDs along with 16 receiving yards. Meanwhile, the defense sacked Saints QB Andy Dalton four times and picked him off once. The Saints did not eclipse 200 total yards of offense until late in the fourth quarter with Baltimore already holding a 27–6 lead. With the win, the Ravens improved to 6–3 heading into their bye week.

==== Week 11: Baltimore Ravens 13, Carolina Panthers 3 ====
Week 11: Carolina Panthers at Baltimore Ravens – Game summary

Quarter	1	2	3	4	Total
Panthers	0	0	3	0	**3**
**Ravens**	0	3	0	10	**13**

at M&T Bank Stadium, Baltimore, Maryland

- Date: November 20
- Game time: 1:00 p.m. EST
- Game weather: Sunny, 36 °F (2 °C)
- Game attendance: 70,677
- Referee: Jerome Boger
- TV announcers (Fox): Kevin Kugler, Mark Sanchez and Laura Okmin
- Recap, Game Book

Game information

**First quarter**

- No scoring plays.

**Second quarter**

- BAL – Justin Tucker 32-yard field goal, 0:00. Ravens 3–0. **Drive: 15 plays, 76 yards, 3:38.**

**Third quarter**

- CAR – Eddy Piñeiro 32-yard field goal, 8:07. Tied 3–3. **Drive: 9 plays, 40 yards, 3:15.**

**Fourth quarter**

- BAL – Justin Tucker 37-yard field goal, 8:27. Ravens 6–3. **Drive: 12 plays, 67 yards, 7:00.**
- BAL – Lamar Jackson 1-yard run (Justin Tucker kick), 7:16. Ravens 13–3. **Drive: 2 plays, 31 yards, 0:58.**

**Top passers**

- CAR – Baker Mayfield – 21/33, 196 yards, 2 INT
- BAL – Lamar Jackson – 24/33, 209 yards, INT

**Top rushers**

- CAR – D'Onta Foreman – 11 rushes, 24 yards
- BAL – Kenyan Drake – 10 rushes, 46 yards

**Top receivers**

- CAR – Terrace Marshall Jr. – 3 receptions, 76 yards
- BAL – Demarcus Robinson – 9 receptions, 128 yards

The Ravens defense had another strong performance en route to a low-scoring 13–3 win. The defense forced three fourth quarter turnovers, sacked Panthers QB Baker Mayfield four times, and held the Panthers to under 200 yards of total offense until under two minutes left in the game. The performance by the defense made up for an unexpectedly sluggish Ravens offense that put up only one scoring drive up until the fourth quarter, which caused the game to be tied at a mere 3–3 before the Ravens pulled away with 10 unanswered points in the final frame. With the win, the Ravens improved to 7–3.

==== Week 12: Jacksonville Jaguars 28, Baltimore Ravens 27 ====
Week 12: Baltimore Ravens at Jacksonville Jaguars – Game summary

Quarter	1	2	3	4	Total
Ravens	6	3	3	15	**27**
**Jaguars**	0	10	0	18	**28**

at TIAA Bank Field, Jacksonville, Florida

- Date: November 27
- Game time: 1:25 p.m. EST
- Game weather: 74 °F (23 °C)
- Game attendance: 59,560
- Referee: Land Clark
- TV announcers (CBS): Andrew Catalon, James Lofton and Amanda Renner
- Recap, Game Book

Game information

**First quarter**

- BAL – Justin Tucker 27-yard field goal, 9:23. Ravens 3–0. **Drive: 11 plays, 65 yards, 5:37.**
- BAL – Justin Tucker 29-yard field goal, 2:03. Ravens 6–0. **Drive: 8 plays, 38 yards, 3:58.**

**Second quarter**

- JAX – JaMycal Hasty 28-yard pass from Trevor Lawrence (Riley Patterson kick), 9:57. Jaguars 7–6. **Drive: 4 plays, 50 yards, 1:55.**
- BAL – Justin Tucker 55-yard field goal, 4:51. Ravens 9–7. **Drive: 12 plays, 38 yards, 5:06.**
- JAX – Riley Patterson 22-yard field goal, 0:09. Jaguars 10–9. **Drive: 12 plays, 71 yards, 4:42.**

**Third quarter**

- BAL – Justin Tucker 24-yard field goal, 7:51. Ravens 12–10. **Drive: 10 plays, 74 yards, 5:29.**

**Fourth quarter**

- BAL – Gus Edwards 1-yard run (Justin Tucker kick), 13:07. Ravens 19–10. **Drive: 7 plays, 25 yards, 2:12.**
- JAX – Jamal Agnew 1-yard pass from Trevor Lawrence (Riley Patterson kick), 5:55. Ravens 19–17. **Drive: 14 plays, 75 yards, 7:12.**
- JAX – Riley Patterson 29-yard field goal, 4:19. Jaguars 20–19. **Drive: 4 plays, 5 yards, 1:23.**
- BAL – Josh Oliver 12-yard pass from Lamar Jackson (Lamar Jackson–Mark Andrews pass), 2:02. Ravens 27–20. **Drive: 6 plays, 75 yards, 2:17.**
- JAX – Marvin Jones 10-yard pass from Trevor Lawrence (Trevor Lawrence–Zay Jones pass), 0:14. Jaguars 28–27. **Drive: 10 plays, 75 yards, 1:48.**

**Top passers**

- BAL – Lamar Jackson – 16/32, 254 yards, TD
- JAX – Trevor Lawrence – 29/37, 321 yards, 3 TD

**Top rushers**

- BAL – Lamar Jackson – 14 rushes, 89 yards
- JAX – JaMycal Hasty – 12 rushes, 28 yards

**Top receivers**

- BAL – Josh Oliver – 4 receptions, 76 yards, TD
- JAX – Zay Jones – 11 receptions, 145 yards

After winning 4 consecutive games in a row, the Baltimore Ravens headed to Jacksonville to get their 5th consecutive win. However, after having a slight lead, the Ravens collapsed entirely, allowing a Jaguars comeback drive that ended with a Marvin Jones Jr. touchdown and a Zay Jones 2-point conversion to give the Jaguars the lead. Justin Tucker attempted a potential game-winning 67-yard field goal at the end of the game, which would've broken his own record for the longest NFL field goal made, but the kick fell short, and the Jaguars won.

==== Week 13: Baltimore Ravens 10, Denver Broncos 9 ====
Week 13: Denver Broncos at Baltimore Ravens – Game summary

Quarter	1	2	3	4	Total
Broncos	3	3	3	0	**9**
**Ravens**	0	3	0	7	**10**

at M&T Bank Stadium, Baltimore, Maryland

- Date: December 4
- Game time: 1:00 p.m. EST
- Game weather: Clear, 43 °F (6 °C)
- Game attendance: 70,443
- Referee: Alex Kemp
- TV announcers (CBS): Kevin Harlan, Trent Green and Melanie Collins
- Recap, Game Book

Game information

**First quarter**

- DEN – Brandon McManus 52-yard field goal, 9:03. Broncos 3–0. **Drive: 11 plays, 49 yards, 5:57.**

**Second quarter**

- BAL – Justin Tucker 26-yard field goal, 5:55. Tied 3–3. **Drive: 10 plays, 62 yards, 5:02.**
- DEN – Brandon McManus 41-yard field goal, 0:37. Broncos 6–3. **Drive: 8 plays, 70 yards, 2:18.**

**Third quarter**

- DEN – Brandon McManus 50-yard field goal, 3:58. Broncos 9–3. **Drive: 4 plays, 8 yards, 2:01.**

**Fourth quarter**

- BAL – Tyler Huntley 2-yard run (Justin Tucker kick), 0:28. Ravens 10–9. **Drive: 16 plays, 91 yards, 4:34.**

**Top passers**

- DEN – Russell Wilson – 17/22, 189 yards
- BAL – Tyler Huntley – 27/32, 187 yards, INT

**Top rushers**

- DEN – Latavius Murray – 17 rushes, 47 yards
- BAL – Tyler Huntley – 10 rushes, 41 yards, TD

**Top receivers**

- DEN – Greg Dulcich – 6 receptions, 85 yards
- BAL – Mark Andrews – 4 receptions, 53 yards

After trailing for almost the entire game, mostly due to what would become a season-ending knee injury to Lamar Jackson, the Ravens capped a 91-yard drive with a game-winning touchdown from backup QB Tyler Huntley with 28 seconds to go. Denver K Brandon McManus attempted a 63-yard potential game-winning field goal as time expired, but the kick fell short. The win improved the Ravens record to 8–4, matching their win total from last year.

==== Week 14: Baltimore Ravens 16, Pittsburgh Steelers 14 ====
Week 14: Baltimore Ravens at Pittsburgh Steelers – Game summary

Quarter	1	2	3	4	Total
**Ravens**	10	3	0	3	**16**
Steelers	7	0	0	7	**14**

at Acrisure Stadium, Pittsburgh, Pennsylvania

- Date: December 11
- Game time: 1:00 p.m. EST
- Game weather: Cloudy, 43 °F (6 °C)
- Game attendance: 66,326
- Referee: Adrian Hill
- TV announcers (CBS): Kevin Harlan, Trent Green and Melanie Collins
- Recap, Game Book

Game information

**First quarter**

- BAL – Justin Tucker 42-yard field goal, 4:46. Ravens 3–0. **Drive: 11 plays, 51 yards, 5:38.**
- BAL – J. K. Dobbins 4-yard run (Justin Tucker kick), 2:31. Ravens 10–0. **Drive: 2 plays, 48 yards, 0:45.**
- PIT – Najee Harris 1-yard run (Chris Boswell kick), 0:13. Ravens 10–7. **Drive: 5 plays, 64 yards, 2:18.**

**Second quarter**

- BAL – Justin Tucker 35-yard field goal, 1:03. Ravens 13–7. **Drive: 10 plays, 54 yards, 4:32.**

**Third quarter**

- No scoring plays.

**Fourth quarter**

- BAL – Justin Tucker 30-yard field goal, 3:19. Ravens 16–7. **Drive: 13 plays, 57 yards, 7:55.**
- PIT – Pat Freiermuth 10-yard pass from Mitchell Trubisky (Chris Boswell kick), 2:30. Ravens 16–14. **Drive: 5 plays, 75 yards, 0:49.**

**Top passers**

- BAL – Tyler Huntley –8/12, 88 yards
- PIT – Mitchell Trubisky – 22/30, 276 yards, TD, 3 INT

**Top rushers**

- BAL – J. K. Dobbins – 15 rushes, 120 yards, TD
- PIT – Najee Harris – 12 rushes, 33 yards, TD

**Top receivers**

- BAL – Demarcus Robinson – 5 receptions, 52 yards
- PIT – Diontae Johnson – 6 receptions, 82 yards

Despite losing QB Tyler Huntley in the third quarter to a concussion, the Ravens used strong performances by RB J. K. Dobbins, K Justin Tucker, and their defense to hold off the Steelers in a 16–14 win. The Steelers also lost their QB Kenny Pickett in the first quarter to a concussion and were forced to rely on Mitchell Trubisky, who threw three interceptions. The Steelers also had a short field goal blocked by DE Calais Campbell in the fourth quarter. Meanwhile, Dobbins ran for 120 yards and a TD while Tucker converted all four of his kicks (1 XP and 3 FGs). With the win, the Ravens improved to 9-4 and remained atop the AFC North due to having the head-to-head tiebreaker over the Cincinnati Bengals.

==== Week 15: Cleveland Browns 13, Baltimore Ravens 3 ====
Week 15: Baltimore Ravens at Cleveland Browns – Game summary

Quarter	1	2	3	4	Total
Ravens	0	3	0	0	**3**
**Browns**	0	6	7	0	**13**

at FirstEnergy Stadium, Cleveland, Ohio

- Date: December 17
- Game time: 4:30 p.m. EST
- Game weather: Cloudy, 32 °F (0 °C)
- Game attendance: 67,431
- Referee: Brad Allen
- TV announcers (NFLN): Rich Eisen, Kurt Warner, Steve Wyche and Stacey Dales
- Recap, Game Book

Game information

**First quarter**

- No scoring plays.

**Second quarter**

- CLE – Cade York 47-yard field goal, 14:10. Browns 3–0. **Drive: 14 plays, 64 yards, 7:42.**
- BAL – Justin Tucker 53-yard field goal, 5:31. Tied 3–3. **Drive: 9 plays, 27 yards, 4:26.**
- CLE – Cade York 23-yard field goal, 1:52. Browns 6–3. **Drive: 11 plays, 71 yards, 3:39.**

**Third quarter**

- CLE – Donovan Peoples-Jones 3-yard pass from Deshaun Watson (Cade York kick), 2:10. Browns 13–3. **Drive: 12 plays, 91 yards, 6:08.**

**Fourth quarter**

- No scoring plays.

**Top passers**

- BAL – Tyler Huntley – 17/30, 138 yards, INT
- CLE – Deshaun Watson – 18/28, 161 yards, TD

**Top rushers**

- BAL – J. K. Dobbins – 13 rushes, 125 yards
- CLE – Nick Chubb – 21 rushes, 99 yards

**Top receivers**

- BAL – Mark Andrews – 3 receptions, 31 yards
- CLE – Amari Cooper – 4 receptions, 58 yards

The Ravens were unable to get anything going on offense and lost to the Browns 3–13 in the second game of a Saturday Tripleheader. The Ravens committed two turnovers and turned the ball over on downs three times. Justin Tucker also missed two of his three field goal attempts, the first of which was blocked while the other was wide left. After the loss, the Baltimore Ravens lost 1st place in the division when the Bengals defeated the Buccaneers the following day.

==== Week 16: Baltimore Ravens 17, Atlanta Falcons 9 ====
Week 16: Atlanta Falcons at Baltimore Ravens – Game summary

Quarter	1	2	3	4	Total
Falcons	0	3	3	3	**9**
**Ravens**	3	11	0	3	**17**

at M&T Bank Stadium, Baltimore, Maryland

- Date: December 24
- Game time: 1:00 p.m. EST
- Game weather: Clear, 17 °F (−8 °C)
- Game attendance: 70,467
- Referee: Bill Vinovich
- TV announcers (Fox): Kenny Albert, Jonathan Vilma and Shannon Spake
- Recap, Game Book

Game information

**First quarter**

- BAL – Justin Tucker 21-yard field goal, 8:02. Ravens 3–0. **Drive: 5 plays, 47 yards, 2:41.**

**Second quarter**

- BAL – Justin Tucker 27-yard field goal, 12:42. Ravens 6–0. **Drive: 7 plays, 47 yards, 3:03.**
- BAL – Demarcus Robinson 6-yard pass from Tyler Huntley (Tyler Huntley run), 2:23. Ravens 14–0. **Drive: 13 plays, 70 yards, 6:49.**
- ATL – Younghoe Koo 32-yard field goal, 0:00. Ravens 14–3. **Drive: 11 plays, 54 yards, 2:23.**

**Third quarter**

- ATL – Younghoe Koo 34-yard field goal, 7:01. Ravens 14–6. **Drive: 17 plays, 63 yards, 7:59.**

**Fourth quarter**

- BAL – Justin Tucker 21-yard field goal, 14:10. Ravens 17–6. **Drive: 6 plays, 55 yards, 2:32.**
- ATL – Younghoe Koo 37-yard field goal, 2:03. Ravens 17–9. **Drive: 9 plays, 35 yards, 2:56.**

**Top passers**

- BAL – Tyler Huntley – 9/17, 115 yards, TD
- ATL – Desmond Ridder– 22/33, 218 yards

**Top rushers**

- BAL – Gus Edwards – 11 rushes, 99 yards
- ATL – Tyler Allgeier – 18 rushes, 74 yards

**Top receivers**

- BAL – Mark Andrews – 3 receptions, 45 yards
- ATL – Drake London – 7 receptions, 96 yards

The Ravens clinched a playoff berth and improved to 10–5 with a 17–9 win over the Falcons. The Ravens held a 14–0 lead late in the second quarter, which was a deficit that the Falcons were unable to overcome. QB Tyler Huntley threw for 115 yards and a TD, while he and RBs Gus Edwards and J. K. Dobbins combined for 184 rushing yards.

==== Week 17: Pittsburgh Steelers 16, Baltimore Ravens 13 ====
Week 17: Pittsburgh Steelers at Baltimore Ravens – Game summary

Quarter	1	2	3	4	Total
**Steelers**	3	0	3	10	**16**
Ravens	0	10	3	0	**13**

at M&T Bank Stadium, Baltimore, Maryland

- Date: January 1
- Game time: 8:20 p.m. EST
- Game weather: Clear, 50 °F (10 °C)
- Game attendance: 71,042
- Referee: Land Clark
- TV announcers (NBC): Mike Tirico, Cris Collinsworth and Melissa Stark
- Recap, Game Book

Game information

**First quarter**

- PIT – Chris Boswell 21-yard field goal, 7:01. Steelers 3–0. **Drive: 15 plays, 73 yards, 7:59.**

**Second quarter**

- BAL – Justin Tucker 30-yard field goal, 14:09. Tied 3–3. **Drive: 15 plays, 61 yards, 7:52.**
- BAL – Isaiah Likely 7-yard pass from Tyler Huntley (Justin Tucker kick), 0:07. Ravens 10–3. **Drive: 11 plays, 62 yards, 3:23.**

**Third quarter**

- BAL – Justin Tucker 51-yard field goal, 9:31. Ravens 13–3. **Drive: 8 plays, 42 yards, 5:29.**
- PIT – Chris Boswell 51-yard field goal, 3:42. Ravens 13–6. **Drive: 12 plays, 43 yards, 5:49.**

**Fourth quarter**

- PIT – Chris Boswell 33-yard field goal, 9:44. Ravens 13–9. **Drive: 13 plays, 80 yards, 6:02.**
- PIT – Najee Harris 10-yard pass from Kenny Pickett (Chris Boswell kick), 0:56. Steelers 16–13. **Drive: 11 plays, 80 yards, 3:20.**

**Top passers**

- PIT – Kenny Pickett – 15/27, 168 yards, TD
- BAL – Tyler Huntley – 14/21, 130 yards, TD, INT

**Top rushers**

- PIT – Najee Harris – 22 rushes, 111 yards
- BAL – J. K. Dobbins – 17 rushes, 93 yards

**Top receivers**

- PIT – Pat Freiermuth – 3 receptions, 36 yards
- BAL – Mark Andrews – 9 receptions, 100 yards

The Ravens blew a 13–3 lead and lost to Kenny Pickett and the Steelers, 16–13, on a 10-yard touchdown pass from Pickett to Najee Harris. With the loss, the Ravens fell to 10–6.

==== Week 18: Cincinnati Bengals 27, Baltimore Ravens 16 ====
Week 18: Baltimore Ravens at Cincinnati Bengals – Game summary

Quarter	1	2	3	4	Total
Ravens	0	7	6	3	**16**
**Bengals**	10	14	3	0	**27**

at Paycor Stadium, Cincinnati, Ohio

- Date: January 8
- Game time: 1:00 p.m. EST
- Game weather: Cloudy, 40 °F (4 °C)
- Game attendance: 65,849
- Referee: Ronald Torbert
- TV announcers (CBS): Kevin Harlan, Trent Green, and Melanie Collins
- Recap, Game Book

Game information

**First quarter**

- CIN – Evan McPherson 34-yard field goal, 5:01. Bengals 3–0. **Drive: 17 plays, 63 yards, 7:49.**
- CIN – Joe Mixon 1-yard run (Evan McPherson kick), 1:11. Bengals 10–0. **Drive: 8 plays, 48 yards, 3:48.**

**Second quarter**

- CIN – Ja'Marr Chase 26-yard pass from Joe Burrow (Evan McPherson kick), 14:12. Bengals 17–0. **Drive: 3 plays, 32 yards, 0:43.**
- BAL – Kenyan Drake 4-yard run (Justin Tucker kick), 1:57. Bengals 17–7. **Drive: 10 plays, 76 yards, 4:08.**
- CIN – Joseph Ossai fumble recovery in the end zone (Evan McPherson kick), 0:30. Bengals 24–7.

**Third quarter**

- BAL – Justin Tucker 26-yard field goal, 10:34. Bengals 24–10. **Drive: 4 plays, 1 yards, 0:52.**
- CIN – Evan McPherson 26-yard field goal, 6:27. Bengals 27–10. **Drive: 8 plays, 67 yards, 4:07.**
- BAL – Justin Tucker 51-yard field goal, 1:59. Bengals 27–13. **Drive: 11 plays, 42 yards, 4:28.**

**Fourth quarter**

- BAL – Justin Tucker 27-yard field goal, 12:17. Bengals 27–16. **Drive: 9 plays, 73 yards, 3:40.**

**Top passers**

- BAL – Anthony Brown – 19/44, 286 yards, 2 INT
- CIN – Joe Burrow – 25/42, 215 yards, TD

**Top rushers**

- BAL – Kenyan Drake – 16 rushes, 60 yards, TD
- CIN – Joe Mixon – 11 rushes, 27 yards, TD

**Top receivers**

- BAL – Isaiah Likely – 8 receptions, 103 yards
- CIN – Ja'Marr Chase – 8 receptions, 86 yards, TD

The Ravens started Anthony Brown for this game due to Tyler Huntley and Lamar Jackson being injured. Brown would commit three of Baltimore’s four turnovers in this 16–27 loss. Had Baltimore won the game, the site of the wild card game between the two teams would be determined by a coin flip, following the rule changes put in place after the Bills-Bengals game was ruled no contest.

=== Standings ===
==== Division ====
AFC North
	W	L	T	PCT	DIV	CONF	PF	PA	STK
^{(3)} Cincinnati Bengals	12	4	0	.750	3–3	8–3	418	322	W8
^{(6)} Baltimore Ravens	10	7	0	.588	3–3	6–6	350	315	L2
Pittsburgh Steelers	9	8	0	.529	3–3	5–7	308	346	W4
Cleveland Browns	7	10	0	.412	3–3	4–8	361	381	L1

==== Conference ====
AFC
#	Team	Division	W	L	T	PCT	DIV	CONF	SOS	SOV	STK
**Division leaders**
1	Kansas City Chiefs	West	14	3	0	.824	6–0	9–3	.453	.422	W5
2	Buffalo Bills	East	13	3	0	.813	4–2	9–2	.489	.471	W7
3	Cincinnati Bengals	North	12	4	0	.750	3–3	8–3	.507	.490	W8
4	Jacksonville Jaguars	South	9	8	0	.529	4–2	8–4	.467	.438	W5
**Wild cards**
5 (Note: LA Chargers claimed the No. 5 seed over Baltimore based on conference record (7–5 vs. 6–6).)	Los Angeles Chargers	West	10	7	0	.588	2–4	7–5	.443	.341	L1
6	Baltimore Ravens	North	10	7	0	.588	3–3	6–6	.509	.456	L2
7 (Note: Miami finished ahead of Pittsburgh based on head-to-head victory, claiming the 7th and final playoff spot.)	Miami Dolphins	East	9	8	0	.529	3–3	7–5	.537	.457	W1
**Did not qualify for the postseason**
8	Pittsburgh Steelers	North	9	8	0	.529	3–3	5–7	.519	.451	W4
9	New England Patriots	East	8	9	0	.471	3–3	6–6	.502	.415	L1
10 (Note: NY Jets and Tennessee finished ahead of Cleveland based on conference record (5–7 vs. 4–8).) (Note: NY Jets finished ahead of Tennessee based on common record (3–3 vs. 2–4 against: Buffalo, Cincinnati, Denver, Green Bay, Jacksonville).)	New York Jets	East	7	10	0	.412	2–4	5–7	.538	.458	L6
11	Tennessee Titans	South	7	10	0	.412	3–3	5–7	.509	.336	L7
12	Cleveland Browns	North	7	10	0	.412	3–3	4–8	.524	.492	L1
13	Las Vegas Raiders	West	6	11	0	.353	3–3	5–7	.474	.397	L3
14	Denver Broncos	West	5	12	0	.294	1–5	3–9	.481	.465	W1
15	Indianapolis Colts	South	4	12	1	.265	1–4–1	4–7–1	.512	.500	L7
16	Houston Texans	South	3	13	1	.206	3–2–1	3–8–1	.481	.402	W1
**Tiebreakers** (Note: When breaking ties for three or more teams under the NFL's rules, they are first broken within divisions, then comparing only the highest ranked remaining team from each division.)

== Postseason ==
=== Schedule ===
Round	Date	Opponent (seed)	Result	Record	Venue	Recap
Wild Card	January 15	at Cincinnati Bengals (3)	L 17–24	0–1	Paycor Stadium	Recap

=== Game summaries ===
==== AFC Wild Card Playoffs: at (3) Cincinnati Bengals ====
AFC Wild Card Playoffs: (6) Baltimore Ravens at (3) Cincinnati Bengals – Game summary

Quarter	1	2	3	4	Total
Ravens	0	10	7	0	17
Bengals	3	6	8	7	24

at Paycor Stadium, Cincinnati, Ohio

- Date: January 15, 2023
- Game time: 8:15 p.m. EST
- Game weather: Mostly clear, 35 °F (2 °C)
- Game attendance: 66,399
- Referee: Clay Martin
- TV announcers (NBC): Mike Tirico, Cris Collinsworth, and Melissa Stark
- Recap, Game Book

Game information

First quarter

- CIN – Evan McPherson 39-yard field goal, 8:22. Bengals 3–0. Drive: 14 plays, 54 yards, 6:38.

Second quarter

- CIN – Ja'Marr Chase 7-yard pass from Joe Burrow (Evan McPherson kick wide right), 14:56. Bengals 9–0. Drive: 10 plays, 60 yards, 6:07.
- BAL – J. K. Dobbins 2-yard pass from Tyler Huntley (Justin Tucker kick), 4:53. Bengals 9–7. Drive: 17 plays, 75 yards, 10:03.
- BAL – Justin Tucker 22-yard field goal, 0:07. Ravens 10–9. Drive: 9 plays, 40 yards, 2:31.

Third quarter

- CIN – Joe Burrow 1-yard rush (Joe Burrow-Tee Higgins pass), 5:02. Bengals 17–10. Drive: 12 plays, 83 yards, 7:08.
- BAL – Demarcus Robinson 41-yard pass from Tyler Huntley (Justin Tucker kick), 2:13. Tied 17–17. Drive: 5 plays, 81 yards, 2:49.

Fourth quarter

- CIN – Sam Hubbard 98-yard fumble return (Evan McPherson kick), 11:39. Bengals 24–17. Drive: 9 plays, 80 yards, 4:15.

Top passers

- BAL – Tyler Huntley – 17/29, 226 yards, 2 TD, 1 INT
- CIN – Joe Burrow – 23/32, 209 yards, 1 TD

Top rushers

- BAL – J. K. Dobbins – 13 rushes, 62 yards
- CIN – Joe Mixon – 11 rushes, 39 yards

Top receivers

- BAL – Mark Andrews – 5 receptions, 73 yards
- CIN – Ja'Marr Chase – 9 receptions, 84 yards, 1 TD

== Individual awards ==
Recipient	Award(s)
Mark Andrews	Pro Bowl
Calais Campbell	Week 14: AFC Special Teams Player of the Week
Devin Duvernay	Pro Bowl
Justin Houston	Week 9: AFC Defensive Player of the Week
Marlon Humphrey	Pro Bowl
Lamar Jackson	September: AFC Offensive Player of the Month
Nick Moore	Second-team All-Pro
Patrick Ricard	Pro Bowl
Roquan Smith	Dec/Jan: AFC Defensive Player of the Month, Pro Bowl, First-team All-Pro
Justin Tucker	Pro Bowl, Second-team All-Pro
