= Geno Stone =

American football player (born 1999)

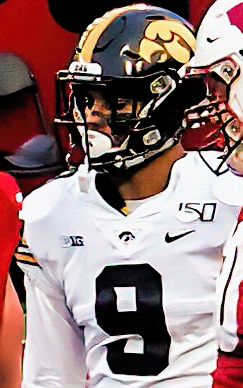
- Stone with the Iowa Hawkeyes in 2019

No. 25 – Buffalo Bills
- Position: Safety
- Roster status: Practice squad

Personal information
- Born: April 19, 1999 (age 27); New Castle, Pennsylvania, U.S.
- Listed height: 5 ft 11 in (1.80 m)
- Listed weight: 207 lb (94 kg)

Career information
- High school: New Castle Junior/Senior
- College: Iowa (2017–2019)
- NFL draft: 2020: 7th round, 219th overall pick

Career history
- Baltimore Ravens (2020); Houston Texans (2020)*; Baltimore Ravens (2021–2023); Cincinnati Bengals (2024–2025); Buffalo Bills (2026–present)
- * Offseason or practice squad member only

Awards and highlights
- Second-team All-Big Ten (2019)

Career NFL statistics as of Week 8, 2026
- Total tackles: 318
- Sacks: 2.0
- Forced fumbles: 1
- Fumble recoveries: 2
- Pass deflections: 22
- Interceptions: 14
- Defensive touchdowns: 2
- Stats at Pro Football Reference

Geno Stone (born April 19, 1999) is an American professional football safety for the Buffalo Bills of the National Football League (NFL). He played college football for the Iowa Hawkeyes, and was selected by the Baltimore Ravens in the seventh round of the 2020 NFL draft.

== Early life ==
Stone grew up in New Castle, Pennsylvania, and attended New Castle Junior/Senior High School, where he played wide receiver, quarterback, and defensive back on the football team and was also a member of the basketball and track & field teams. He was named first-team All-State as a senior after recording 97 tackles with 13 tackles for loss, three sacks, and 10 interceptions. A 2-star recruit, Stone initially committed to play college football at Kent State over offers from Ball State, Buffalo, Delaware, and Miami (OH), among others, but he flipped his commitment to Iowa after receiving a late offer from the school.

== College career ==
Stone played in all 13 of Iowa's games as a true freshman, appearing mostly on special teams and finishing the season with 17 tackles and one interception. He became a starter during his sophomore year, recording 39 tackles with a forced fumble, three passes broken up and four interceptions, one of which he returned for a touchdown and was named honorable mention All-Big Ten Conference. As a junior, Stone recorded 70 tackles, three tackles for loss, one sack, four passes broken up, three forces fumbles, one interception, and one fumble recovery and was named second-team All-Big Ten. Following the end of the season Stone declared to enter the 2020 NFL draft, forgoing his final year of NCAA eligibility.

== Professional career ==
=== Pre-draft ===
NFL analyst Matt Miller of Bleacher Report ranked Stone as the 12th best safety prospect in the draft. NFL draft analysts projected him to be possibly drafted as early as the third round to as late as the fifth round.

Pre-draft measurables
Height	Weight	Arm length	Hand span	Wingspan	40-yard dash	10-yard split	20-yard split	Vertical jump	Broad jump	Bench press
5 ft 10 3/8 in (1.79 m)	207 lb (94 kg)	29 1/4 in (0.74 m)	9 1/8 in (0.23 m)	5 ft 11 in (1.80 m)	4.62 s	1.53 s	2.64 s	33.5 in (0.85 m)	9 ft 8 in (2.95 m)	12 reps
All values from NFL Combine

=== Baltimore Ravens (first stint) ===
External videos
- Ravens draft Geno Stone No. 219

The Baltimore Ravens selected Stone in the seventh round (219th overall) of the 2020 NFL draft. He was the 19th safety drafted.

"Geno might be the best seventh-round pick that we've ever had – playmaker, attitude, special teams, [He had] just an excellent season [in 2023]. He has been cut, been brought back. I love his cerebral nature, [and] I love his attitude on the field. He fancies himself an overachiever; I love that about him."

— Eric DeCosta (Ravens' GM)

On May 7, 2020, the Baltimore Ravens signed Stone to a four–year, $3.40 million contract that includes an initial signing bonus of $107,155.

Throughout training camp, Stone competed for a role as a backup safety against Anthony Levine and Jordan Richards. Head coach John Harbaugh named him a backup free safety to start the season, behind starting safeties DeShon Elliott and Chuck Clark.

On October 8, 2020, the Baltimore Ravens waived Stone and re-signed to the practice squad two days later. On November 8, 2020, Stone made his professional regular season debut during a 24–10 victory at the Indianapolis Colts. On November 17, 2020, he was promoted to the active roster. On December 2, 2020, the Baltimore Ravens placed Stone on the reserve/COVID-19 list and activated on December 21. On December 28, 2020, the Baltimore Ravens waived Stone again.

=== Houston Texans ===
On December 29, 2020, the Houston Texans claimed Stone off waivers. He only appeared in two games for the Baltimore Ravens during his rookie season in 2020 and was only limited to special teams.

=== Baltimore Ravens (second stint) ===
==== 2021 ====
On March 23, 2021, the Baltimore Ravens signed Stone to a one–year, $780,000 contract after the Texans did not extend him a qualifying offer. During training camp, he competed for a roster spot as a backup safety against Anthony Levine, Tony Jefferson, Brandon Stephens, and Ar'Darius Washington. Head coach John Harbaugh named Stone a backup safety to begin the season and he was listed fifth on the depth chart behind DeShon Elliott, Chuck Clark, Anthony Levine, and Brandon Stephens.

On September 19, 2021, Stone made his first career tackle during a 36–35 victory against the Kansas City Chiefs. Due to numerous injuries to the Ravens' defense, Stone saw increased playing time as the season progressed. On December 19, 2021, Stone earned his first career start and made a season-high seven combined tackles (three solo) during a 30–31 loss to the Green Bay Packers. On January 9, 2022, he recorded two solo tackles, a pass deflection, and made his first career interception off a pass thrown by Ben Roethlisberger to wide receiver Ray-Ray McCloud as the Ravens lost 13–16 in overtime to the Pittsburgh Steelers. He finished the 2021 NFL season with 21 combined tackles (15 solo), one pass deflection, and one interception in 15 games and one start.

==== 2022 ====
On March 9, 2022, the Baltimore Ravens placed an exclusive-rights free agent tender on Stone for a one–year, $895,000 contract. Defensive coordinator Don Martindale held a competition to name the starting safeties during training camp following the departures of DeShon Elliott and Anthony Levine and the transitions of Brandon Stephens and Ar'Darius Washington from safety to cornerback. He competed against Tony Jefferson, Chuck Clark, Marcus Williams, and 2022 rookie first-round pick Kyle Hamilton. Head coach John Harbaugh named Stone the third strong safety in the depth chart to begin the season, behind starter Chuck Clark and primary backup Tony Jefferson. Marcus Williams was named the starting free safety with Kyle Hamilton as his backup.

In Week 5, starting free safety Marcus Williams dislocated his wrist during a 19–17 win against the Cincinnati Bengals. Head coach John Harbaugh named Stone the starting free safety heading into Week 6. On October 28, 2022, Stone collected a season-high eight solo tackles as the Ravens defeated the Cleveland Browns 23–20. In Week 14, Stone was demoted back to a backup safety after Marcus Williams returned from injury to reclaim his starting role. He finished the 2022 NFL season with 38 total tackles (34 solo), one pass defended, and one forced fumble, which he recovered.

==== 2023 ====
On March 17, 2023, the Baltimore Ravens signed Stone to a one–year, $1.76 million contract that included an initial signing bonus of $750,000. He entered training camp slated as a backup safety and competed for a roster spot against Daryl Worley and Jaquan Amos. Head coach John Harbaugh named Stone a primary backup safety to begin the season, behind starters Kyle Hamilton and Marcus Williams.

In the Baltimore Ravens' home-opener against the Houston Texans, starting free safety Marcus Williams suffered a torn pectoral. Head coach John Harbaugh subsequently appointed Stone as his replacement at starting free safety. On September 17, 2023, he made his first start of the season and made a season-high nine combined tackles (seven solo), a pass deflection, and intercepted a pass thrown by Joe Burrow to wide receiver Tee Higgins during a 27–24 victory at the Cincinnati Bengals. On October 15, 2023, he made three combined tackles (one solo), one pass deflection, and intercepted a pass by Ryan Tannehill during a 24–16 victory at the Tennessee Titans. The following week, he made three solo tackles, one pass deflection, and intercepted a pass by Jared Goff as the Ravens routed the Detroit Lions 38–6. In Week 8, he recorded four combined tackles (three solo), a pass deflection, and intercepted a pass by Joshua Dobbs during a 31–24 win at the Arizona Cardinals. On November 5, 2023, Stone recorded one solo tackle, a season-high two pass deflections, and had his fourth consecutive game with an interception on a pass thrown by Geno Smith to wide receiver Tyler Lockett as the Ravens routed the Seattle Seahawks 37–3. In Week 17, he produced eight combined tackles (six solo), one pass deflection, and set a career-high with his seventh interception of the season on a pass by Tua Tagovailoa as they defeated the Miami Dolphins 56–19. He finished the 2023 NFL season with a total of 68 combined tackles (44 solo), nine pass deflections, and a career-high seven interceptions in 16 games and 11 starts. He had the second most interceptions in 2023, after Dallas Cowboys cornerback DaRon Bland.

=== Cincinnati Bengals ===
==== 2024 ====
On March 11, 2024, the Cincinnati Bengals signed Stone to a two–year, $14 million contract that includes $6 million guaranteed upon signing and an initial signing bonus of $3 million. He entered training camp slated as the de facto starting strong safety. Head coach Zac Taylor named Stone and Vonn Bell the starting safeties to start the 2024 NFL season.

In Week 11, he racked up a season-high nine combined tackles (seven solo) and recovered a fumble in the Bengals' 27–34 loss at the Los Angeles Chargers. On December 9, 2024, Stone made five combined tackles (three solo), a pass deflection, and intercepted a pass by Cooper Rush to CeeDee Lamb during a 27–20 win at the Dallas Cowboys. On December 15, 2024, Stone made five combined tackles (one solo), a pass deflection, and intercepted a pass by Will Levis to tight end Chig Okonkwo and returned it 39–yards for his first career touchdown in a 37–27 win at the Tennessee Titans. On December 22, 2024, Stone made one solo tackle, a season-high two pass deflections, and had his third consecutive game with an interception after picking off a pass by Dorian Thompson-Robinson as the Bengals routed the Cleveland Browns 24–6. He started 17 games during the 2024 NFL season and finished with 81 combined tackles (47 solo), six pass deflections, four interceptions, and one touchdown. He received an overall grade of 53.1 from Pro Football Focus.

=== Buffalo Bills ===
On March 16, 2026, Stone signed with the Buffalo Bills on a one-year contract. Stone was released by the Bills on August 30 as a part of final roster cuts; he was re-signed to the team's practice squad the next day.

== NFL career statistics ==
Legend
**Bold**	Career high

=== Regular season ===
Year	Team	Games		Tackles					Interceptions						Fumbles			
Year	Team	GP	GS	Cmb	Solo	Ast	Sck	TFL	PD	Int	Yds	Avg	Lng	TD	FF	FR	Yds	TD
2020	BAL	2	0	0	0	0	0.0	0	0	0	0	0.0	0	0	0	0	0	0
2021	BAL	15	1	21	15	6	0.0	1	1	1	0	0.0	0	0	0	0	0	0
2022	BAL	17	7	38	34	4	0.0	0	1	0	0	0.0	0	0	**1**	**1**	0	0
2023	BAL	17	11	68	44	24	0.0	0	**9**	**7**	**101**	14.4	36	0	0	0	0	0
2024	CIN	17	17	81	47	34	0.0	0	6	4	88	22	**49**	**1**	0	**1**	**6**	0
2025	CIN	17	17	**104**	**65**	**39**	**2.0**	**4**	4	2	57	**28.5**	32	**1**	0	0	0	0
2026	BUF	1	1	6	2	4	0.0	1	1	0	0	0.0	0	0	0	0	0	0
Career		86	54	318	207	111	2.0	6	22	14	246	17.6	49	2	1	2	6	0

=== Postseason ===
Year	Team	Games		Tackles					Interceptions						Fumbles			
Year	Team	GP	GS	Cmb	Solo	Ast	Sck	TFL	PD	Int	Yds	Avg	Lng	TD	FF	FR	Yds	TD
2022	BAL	1	0	1	**1**	0	0.0	0	0	0	0	0.0	0	0	0	0	0	0
2023	BAL	**2**	0	**2**	0	**2**	0.0	0	0	0	0	0.0	0	0	0	0	0	0
Career		3	0	3	1	2	0.0	0	0	0	0	0.0	0	0	0	0	0	0
