= Poe (mascot) =

Mascot for the NFL's Baltimore Ravens

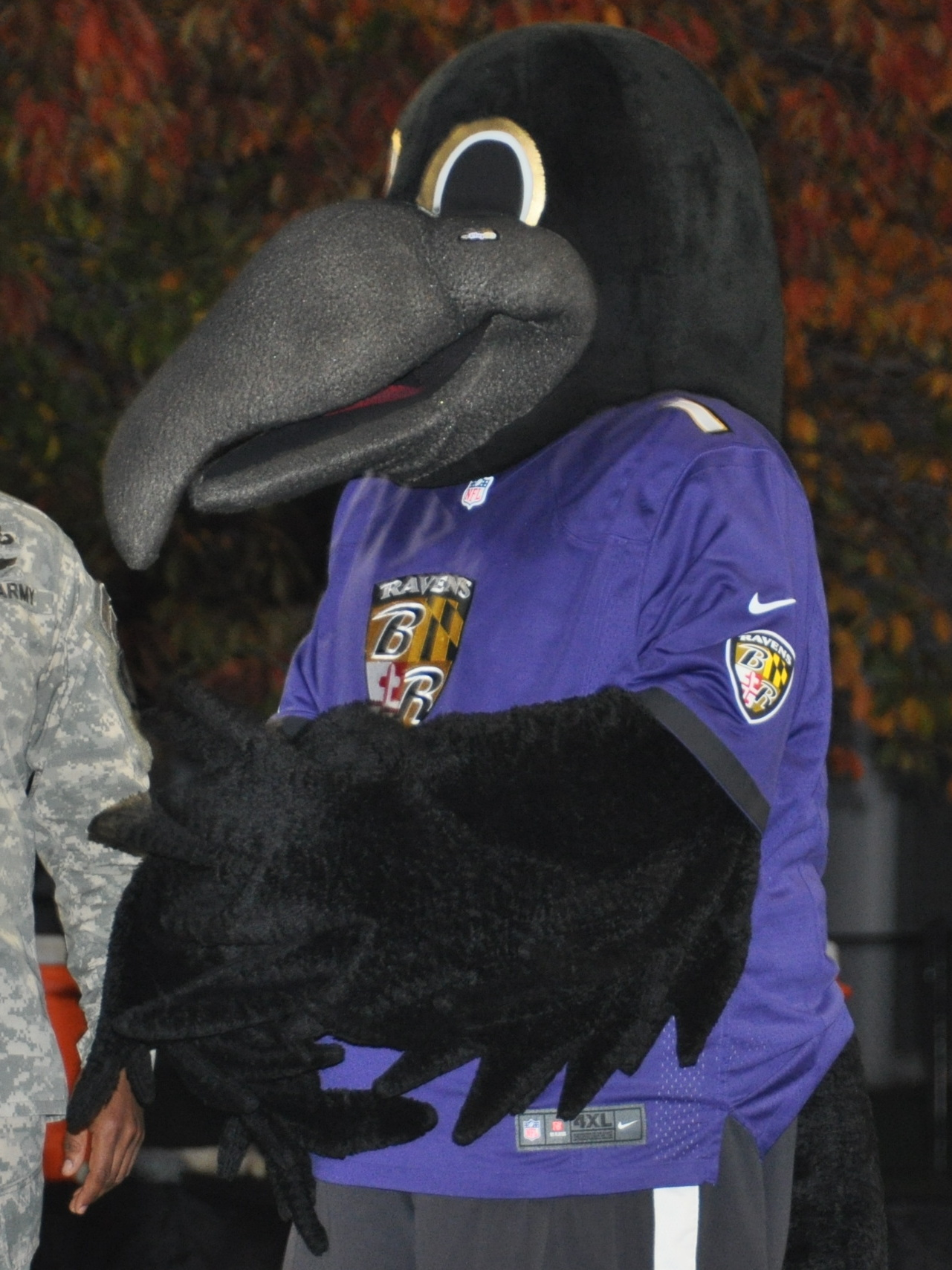
Poe in 2013

Poe is the mascot of the Baltimore Ravens of the National Football League (NFL). He is named after the writer and Baltimore, Maryland resident, Edgar Allan Poe.

Poe is depicted as a raven. Because the Baltimore Ravens were named after the poem "The Raven" by Baltimore resident Edgar Allan Poe, it was natural that the team name their mascots after Poe himself.

== Poe's brothers ==
When originally unveiled, Poe was one of three costumed mascots, all raven brothers named "Edgar", "Allan", and "Poe". Because the Baltimore Ravens were named after the poem "The Raven" by Baltimore resident Edgar Allan Poe, it was natural that the team name their mascots after Poe himself. The three not only commemorated the famous Baltimore poet but also represented three completely different personalities and their stereotypical relation to certain types of NFL players.

According to the back story, Edgar was the first to hatch. Edgar was tall and broad-shouldered, representing the "backfield" or the players of the game routinely not staged on the line of scrimmage. This represented the linebacker, defensive back, fullback, quarterback, etc. Edgar was decidedly proud, if not arrogant, and was the trio's leader.

Allan represented the Ravens’ receivers and running backs. He was depicted as shorter, thinner and faster than Edgar and Poe.

Poe was the final mascot in the trio to hatch. Characterized by a short and stout build, Poe is designed to represent football linemen. He is depicted as slow, relaxed, and affable, frequently interacting with fans at stadium tailgate parties in a never-ending search for cheeseburgers.

After the 2008 season ended, Edgar and Allan were retired, leaving Poe as the sole mascot of the Baltimore Ravens. For the 2009 season, Poe was joined by two real live ravens, "Rise" and "Conquer".

After Poe suffered an injury in a halftime event during a preseason game, Edgar and Allan were brought out of retirement for the 2022 season. Poe returned in week 17 of that season against the Pittsburgh Steelers, a divisional rival.
