= Rayshad Nichols =

American football player (born 1998)

Profile
- Position: Defensive end

Personal information
- Born: June 9, 1998 (age 28); Bridge City, Louisiana, U.S.
- Listed height: 6 ft 2 in (1.88 m)
- Listed weight: 305 lb (138 kg)

Career information
- High school: L. W. Higgins (Marrero, Louisiana)
- College: Stephen F. Austin
- NFL draft: 2022: undrafted

Career history
- Baltimore Ravens (2022–2023); DC Defenders (2025)*
- * Offseason or practice squad member only

Career NFL statistics
- Total tackles: 4
- Stats at Pro Football Reference

Rayshad Nichols (born June 9, 1998) is an American professional football defensive end. He played college football for the Stephen F. Austin Lumberjacks.

== Professional career ==
Pre-draft measurables
Height	Weight	Arm length	Hand span	40-yard dash	10-yard split	20-yard split	20-yard shuttle	Three-cone drill	Vertical jump	Broad jump	Bench press
6 ft 2 7/8 in (1.90 m)	306 lb (139 kg)	33 in (0.84 m)	9 in (0.23 m)	5.35 s	1.82 s	3.06 s	4.78 s	7.64 s	29.5 in (0.75 m)	8 ft 5 in (2.57 m)	19 reps
All values from Pro Day

=== Baltimore Ravens ===
After not being selected in the 2022 NFL draft, Nichols signed with the Baltimore Ravens as an undrafted free agent on April 30. On August 30, Nichols was waived by the Ravens. The following day, he was re-signed to the practice squad. Nichols was elevated to the active roster on December 31, and made his debut the following day against the Pittsburgh Steelers, playing fifteen snaps and recording four tackles. He signed a reserve/future contract on January 16, 2023.

On August 29, 2023, Nichols was waived by the Ravens and re-signed to the practice squad. He signed a reserve/future contract on January 29, 2024. Nichols was waived with an injury settlement on July 31.

=== DC Defenders ===
On January 23, 2025, Nichols signed with the DC Defenders of the United Football League (UFL). He was released on March 20, 2025.
