= Eric DeCosta =

American football executive (born 1971)

Baltimore Ravens
- Title: General manager, Executive vice president

Personal information
- Born: April 10, 1971 (age 55); Taunton, Massachusetts, U.S.

Career information
- High school: Taunton (MA)
- College: Colby College & Trinity College

Career history
- Baltimore Ravens (1996–present); Player personnel assistant (1996–1997); Area scout (1998–2002); Director of college scouting (2003–2008); Director of player personnel (2009–2011); Assistant general manager (2012–2018); Executive vice president & general manager (2019–present)

Awards and highlights
- 2× Super Bowl champion (XXXV, XLVII); Sporting News Executive of the Year (2019)
- Executive profile at Pro Football Reference

Eric DeCosta (born April 10, 1971) is an American professional football executive who is the executive vice president and general manager of the Baltimore Ravens of the National Football League (NFL).

DeCosta has been with the Ravens organization since 1996 and previously served as assistant general manager under Ozzie Newsome from 2012 to 2018.

== Early life and education ==
DeCosta attended high school at Taunton High School (Taunton, Massachusetts) and played college football at Colby College, where he served as team captain in 1992 under head coach, Tom Austin. A Dean's List student who graduated with honors, DeCosta earned bachelor of art's degrees in English and Classical Civilizations in 1993. In 1996, DeCosta received a master's degree in English from Trinity College, Hartford.

DeCosta has been a member of the Board of Trustees at Colby College since 2021.

== Executive career ==
=== Baltimore Ravens ===
Prior to his stint in the NFL, DeCosta worked at Trinity College (1993–1996) as a Graduate Fellow, coaching football in the Athletic Department.

In April 2008, DeCosta and the Ravens traded the eighth pick in the 2008 Draft to the Jacksonville Jaguars for the 26th pick in the first round and other picks. The Ravens then traded the 26th overall pick and their third round pick to the Houston Texans for the 18th pick, where the Ravens then selected 2008 Diet Pepsi Rookie of the Year winner, QB Joe Flacco from the University of Delaware. In his first season as Ravens starting quarterback, Flacco led the Ravens to the AFC Championship Game, where they lost to the eventual Super Bowl Champion Pittsburgh Steelers.

The next year, in April 2009, DeCosta and Newsome traded the 26th pick in the 2009 Draft and another pick to the New England Patriots for the 23rd pick in the first round. The Ravens then selected 2009 Offensive Rookie of the Year runner-up Michael Oher, OT, from Ole Miss. Oher was featured in Michael Lewis' acclaimed book, The Blind Side: Evolution of a Game which was also made into a movie starring Sandra Bullock.

In January 2010, after reportedly being a finalist for the Seattle Seahawks general manager position, DeCosta removed his name from consideration prior to interviewing for the post.

One year later in March 2011, in an interview at the annual Owners' Meetings in New Orleans, Louisiana, Ravens owner Steve Bisciotti referred to DeCosta as general manager Ozzie Newsome's eventual successor.

In January 2012, DeCosta signed a new contract with Baltimore that would make him one of the highest paid executives in the NFL. On February 2, 2018, the Ravens announced that DeCosta would take over as general manager for Ozzie Newsome following the 2018 season. That year, the Ravens made news on draft day by trading their second round pick in the 2019 NFL Draft to the Eagles in exchange for Philadelphia's 2018 first round pick, the last pick of the round. Newsome and DeCosta used that pick to select QB Lamar Jackson from Louisville. Jackson finished the 2018 season as the starting quarterback for the Ravens, leading the Ravens over the last seven games to a 6-1 record and an AFC North championship. The Ravens played a home playoff game vs the Los Angeles Chargers on January 5, losing to the Chargers and being eliminated from the playoffs in the process. Jackson was the youngest quarterback to ever start a playoff game.

DeCosta's first offseason (2019) as general manager was defined by a series of moves that were controversial at the outset DeCosta's first move was trading QB Joe Flacco to the Denver Broncos for a 4th round draft pick in the 2019 NFL Draft (later used to select RB Justice Hill). The Ravens reached a long-term contracts with Nick Boyle, from Delaware, regarded as being one of the better blocking tight ends in the league, and Tavon Young, a CB who played at Temple and was a fourth round pick in 2017. At the start of the new league year, DeCosta allowed four starters from the 2018 Ravens defense to test the free-agency market, Pro Bowl linebacker C.J. Mosley, outside linebacker Za'Darius Smith, Pro Bowl outside linebacker Terrell Suggs, and Pro Bowl safety Eric Weddle. All four players subsequently reached lucrative deals with other teams, creating major voids on the Ravens roster.

In response, the Ravens and DeCosta surprised the NFL and reached a four-year agreement with All-Pro safety Earl Thomas and a three-year contract with running back Mark Ingram. They also extended Pro Bowl kicker Justin Tucker and selected WR Marquise Brown, OLB Jaylon Ferguson, WR Miles Boykin, RB Justice Hill, and OG Ben Powers among others in the 2019 NFL Selection Draft.

DeCosta made three training camp trades with other teams that fortified the roster and accumulated additional draft picks for the 2020 Draft. The Ravens traded G Alex Lewis to the NY Jets for a 7th round draft pick (later used to select safety Geno Stone out of Iowa). Also, the Ravens got a 5th round pick from the Minnesota Vikings for Kaare Vedvik, an undrafted punter/kicker who was not going to make the 53-man roster due to Justin Tucker and Sam Koch. Vedvik was cut by the Vikings prior to week 1 of the regular season. Lastly, the Ravens traded OT Jermaine Eluemunor and a 6th round pick to the New England Patriots for their 4th round pick (later used to select ILB Malik Harrison from Ohio State in the 2020 NFL Draft).

The Ravens started the season 2-2 before winning their remaining twelve regular season games and finishing with the best record in the NFL (14-2) in the 2019 season. Along the way, just before the trade deadline, DeCosta made a season-changing trade by dealing a 5th round pick and LB Kenny Young to the Los Angeles Rams for CB Marcus Peters, a move that seemingly fortified the Ravens defense. DeCosta also reached extensions with Pro Bowl fullback Patrick Ricard and veteran wide receiver Willie Snead during the 2019 season.

Ravens players and coaches accumulated many accolades after the 2019 season, including thirteen Pro Bowl players, Coach of the Year John Harbaugh, and NFL MVP Lamar Jackson. In May 2020, DeCosta was named NFL Executive of the Year by Sporting News.

In 2020, DeCosta drafted three players who would eventually become Pro Bowlers in Baltimore, inside linebacker Patrick Queen from Louisiana State University, defensive tackle Justin Madubuike from Texas A&M and kick returner Devin Duvernay from the University of Texas at Austin.

On April 28, 2022, DeCosta and the Ravens traded DeCosta's first career first round pick made as General Manager in 2019, Marquise Brown and a third rounder to the Arizona Cardinals, reuniting Brown with his college quarterback, Kyler Murray. The Ravens received the 23rd pick in the 2022 NFL Draft which DeCosta then traded to the Buffalo Bills for the 25th pick in the first and pick 130 in the fourth. DeCosta drafted All-Pro safety Kyle Hamilton out of Notre Dame University with the fourteenth pick in the first round, selected Pro Bowler Tyler Linderbaum from University of Iowa with the 25th pick acquired from Buffalo and punter Jordan Stout, a punter out of Penn State University with the extra pick 130 also received from the Bills.

On April 27, 2023, after a lengthy two-year negotiation, DeCosta reached a five-year agreement with superstar QB Lamar Jackson on a five-year, 260 million contract that made him the highest-paid player in the NFL. During the negotiation, Jackson represented himself, eschewing an agent, and at one point had demanded a trade. Jackson won the MVP award following the 2023 season for a second time in five-seasons. The Ravens under DeCosta and HC John Harbaugh's leadership, finished with the best record in the NFL for the second time since 2019.

In December 2024, the Ravens, under DeCosta’s leadership, were voted the third best front office in professional sports, behind the Oklahoma City Thunder and Los Angeles Dodgers, and the best front-office in the National Football League. The survey, conducted by The Athletic, featured forty executives and coaches from North American professional sports teams.
