= Jalyn Armour-Davis =

American football player (born 1999)

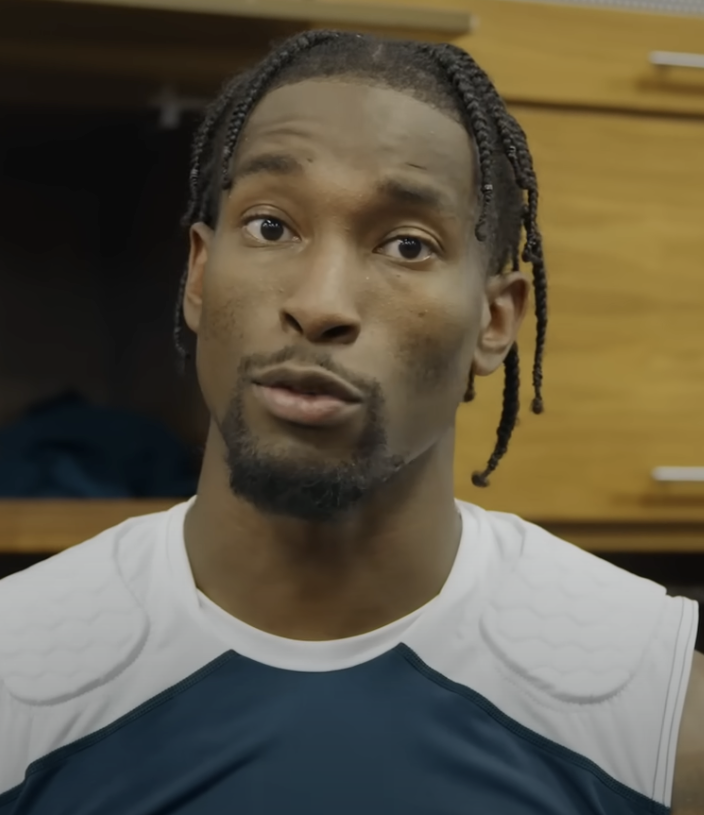
- Armour-Davis in 2025

No. 36 – Los Angeles Chargers
- Position: Cornerback
- Roster status: Practice squad

Personal information
- Born: September 3, 1999 (age 27); Mobile, Alabama, U.S.
- Listed height: 6 ft 1 in (1.85 m)
- Listed weight: 200 lb (91 kg)

Career information
- High school: St. Paul's Episcopal (Mobile)
- College: Alabama (2018–2021)
- NFL draft: 2022: 4th round, 119th overall pick

Career history
- Baltimore Ravens (2022–2024); Tennessee Titans (2025); Los Angeles Chargers (2026–present)*
- * Offseason or practice squad member only

Awards and highlights
- CFP national champion (2020); Second-team All-SEC (2021)

Career NFL statistics as of 2025
- Total tackles: 54
- Pass deflections: 4
- Stats at Pro Football Reference

Jalyn Armour-Davis (born September 3, 1999) is an American professional football cornerback for the Los Angeles Chargers of the National Football League (NFL). He played college football for the Alabama Crimson Tide.

== Early life ==
Armour-Davis grew up in Mobile, Alabama and attended St. Paul's Episcopal School. He was rated a four-star recruit and committed to play college football at Alabama.

== College career ==
Armour-Davis suffered a season-ending knee injury during preseason training camp as a freshman and used a medical redshirt. He played in eight games during his redshirt freshman season. Armour-Davis played mostly on special teams as a redshirt sophomore. He was named a starter at cornerback going into his redshirt junior year and finished the season with 32 tackles, four passes broken up and three interceptions. Following the end of the season, Armour-Davis entered the 2022 NFL draft.

== Professional career ==
Pre-draft measurables
Height	Weight	Arm length	Hand span	Wingspan	40-yard dash	10-yard split	20-yard split	20-yard shuttle	Three-cone drill	Vertical jump	Broad jump	Bench press
6 ft 0 5/8 in (1.84 m)	197 lb (89 kg)	30 7/8 in (0.78 m)	9 1/4 in (0.23 m)	6 ft 2 1/2 in (1.89 m)	4.39 s	1.52 s	2.57 s	4.37 s	7.26 s	36.5 in (0.93 m)	9 ft 10 in (3.00 m)	14 reps
All values from NFL Combine/Pro Day

=== Baltimore Ravens ===
Armour-Davis was selected by the Baltimore Ravens in the fourth round, with the 119th overall selection, of the 2022 NFL draft. He played in four games as a rookie before being placed on injured reserve on November 26, 2022, with a hip injury.

In the 2023 season, he appeared in eight games and logged six total tackles.

Armour-Davis made seven appearances (two starts) for Baltimore in 2024, recording one pass deflection and eight combined tackles. On January 3, 2025, he was placed on injured reserve with a hamstring injury, ending his season.

On August 26, 2025, Armour-Davis was waived by the Ravens in final roster cuts.

=== Tennessee Titans ===
On August 27, 2025, Armour-Davis was claimed off waivers by the Tennessee Titans. He was named a starting cornerback in Week 3, and finished the season with 34 tackles and two passes defensed through 11 games (including 10 starts). In Tennessee's Week 17 matchup against the New Orleans Saints, Armour-Davis suffered a season-ending torn Achilles tendon.

=== Los Angeles Chargers ===
On November 2, 2026, Armour-Davis signed with the Los Angeles Chargers practice squad.

== NFL career statistics ==
Legend
**Bold**	Career high

=== Regular season ===
Year	Team	Games		Tackles					Interceptions						Fumbles				
Year	Team	GP	GS	Cmb	Solo	Ast	Sck	TFL	Int	Yds	Avg	Lng	TD	PD	FF	Fmb	FR	Yds	TD
2022	BAL	4	1	6	4	2	0.0	**1**	0	0	0.0	0	0	1	0	0	0	0	0
2023	BAL	8	0	6	2	4	0.0	0	0	0	0.0	0	0	0	0	0	0	0	0
2024	BAL	7	2	8	6	2	0.0	0	0	0	0.0	0	0	1	0	0	0	0	0
2025	TEN	11	10	**34**	**18**	**16**	0.0	**1**	0	0	0.0	0	0	**2**	0	0	0	0	0
Career		30	13	54	30	24	0.0	2	0	0	0.0	0	0	4	0	0	0	0	0
