= Kyle Hamilton =

American football player (born 2001)

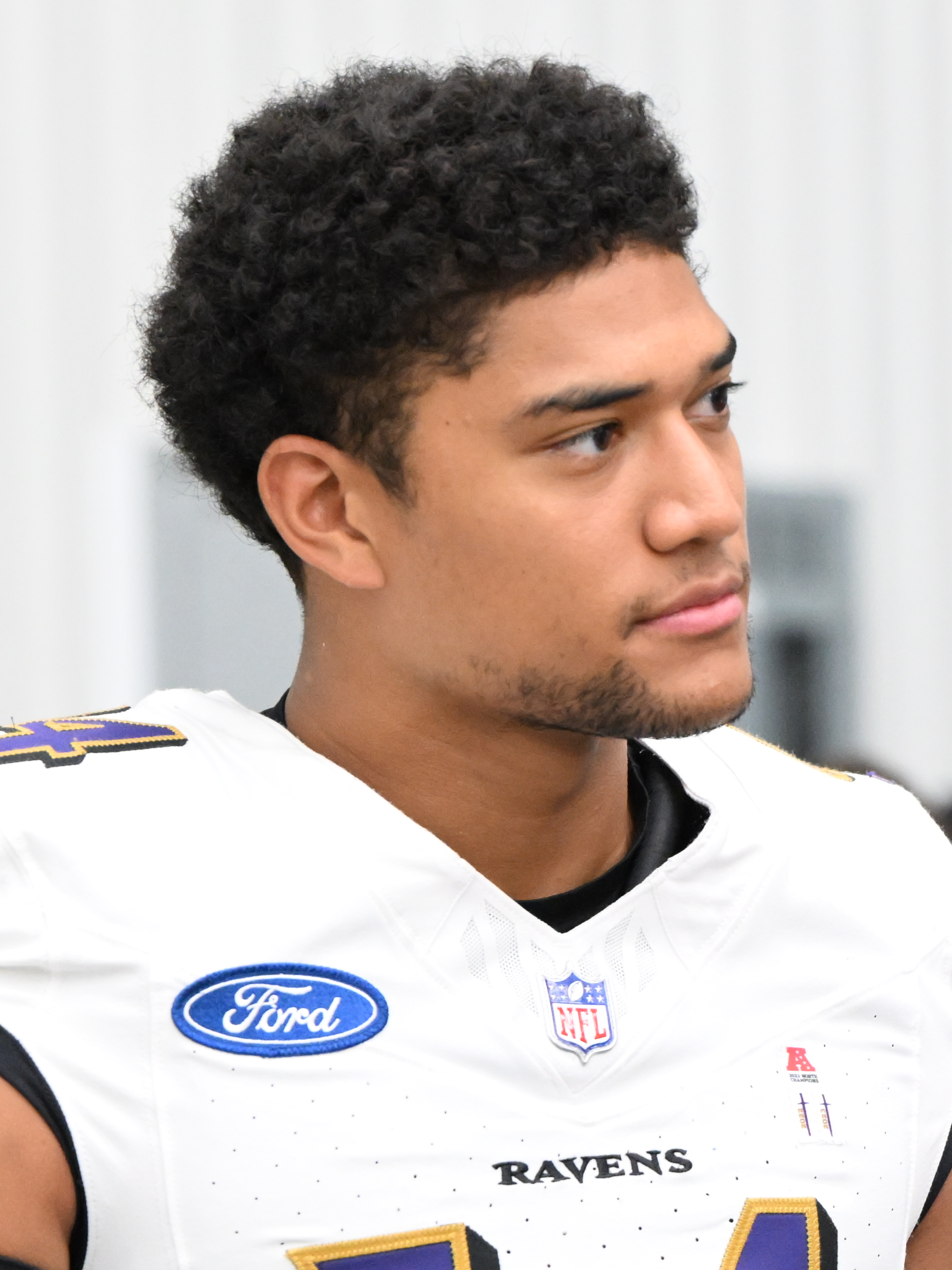
- Hamilton at the 2024 Baltimore Ravens training camp in Owings Mills, Maryland

No. 14 – Baltimore Ravens
- Position: Safety
- Roster status: Active

Personal information
- Born: March 16, 2001 (age 25); Heraklion, Crete, Greece
- Listed height: 6 ft 4 in (1.93 m)
- Listed weight: 220 lb (100 kg)

Career information
- High school: Marist (Brookhaven, Georgia, U.S.)
- College: Notre Dame (2019–2021)
- NFL draft: 2022: 1st round, 14th overall pick

Career history
- Baltimore Ravens (2022–present)

Awards and highlights
- 2× First-team All-Pro (2023, 2025); Second-team All-Pro (2024); 3× Pro Bowl (2023–2025); PFWA All-Rookie Team (2022); Consensus All-American (2021); First-team All-American (2020); Freshman All-American (2019); First-team All-ACC (2020)

Career NFL statistics as of Week 7, 2026
- Total tackles: 405
- Sacks: 8
- Forced fumbles: 7
- Fumble recoveries: 1
- Pass deflections: 40
- Interceptions: 6
- Defensive touchdowns: 1
- Stats at Pro Football Reference

Other information
- Kyle Hamilton's voice Kyle Hamilton talks about the 2024 NFL Pro Camp being held at Camp Humphreys. Recorded April 13, 2024

Kyle Devin Hamilton (born March 16, 2001) is an American professional football safety for the Baltimore Ravens of the National Football League (NFL). He played college football for the Notre Dame Fighting Irish, earning consensus All-American honors in 2021 before being selected by the Ravens in the first round of the 2022 NFL draft.

== Early life ==
The son of professional basketball player Derrick Hamilton, Hamilton was born in Heraklion, the capital of the Greek island of Crete, on March 16, 2001. His father is African American and his mother is South Korean. Derrick Hamilton trains professional athletes but not his son. Kyle briefly lived in Russia and Israel before he was three, moving to the Atlanta area after his father retired from basketball.

Kyle Hamilton attended the Marist School in Brookhaven, Georgia, an Atlanta suburb and adjacent to the city; he played safety and wide receiver for their football team. He played in the 2019 All-American Bowl and committed to play college football at the University of Notre Dame in Notre Dame, Indiana. Kyle's older brother, Tyler played college basketball for University of Pennsylvania in Philadelphia and for the College of William & Mary in Williamsburg, Virginia.

== College career ==
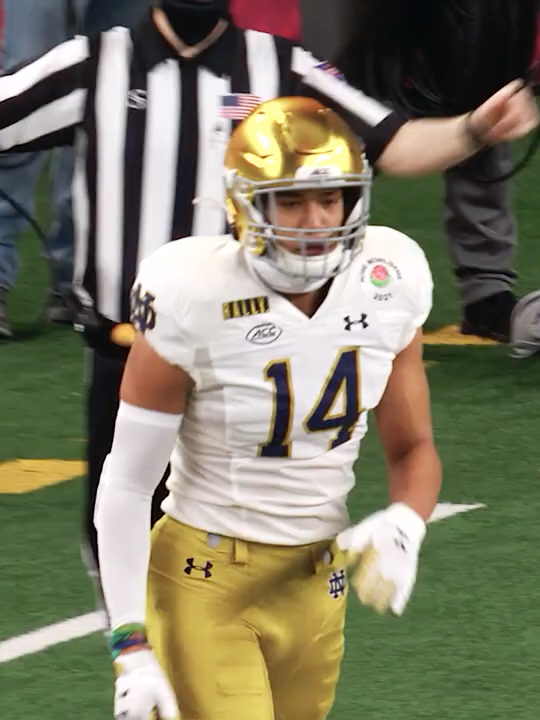
Hamilton with Notre Dame playing against Alabama in 2021

In his second career game for Notre Dame in 2019, Hamilton intercepted a deflected pass and went 35 yards into the endzone for his first career touchdown. Two weeks later against Virginia, Hamilton had one interception and two solo tackles in a 35–20 win. Hamilton played in 13 games as a freshman with one start and recorded 41 tackles, four interceptions, and a touchdown. He was named a Freshman All-American by the Football Writers Association of America.

Hamilton took over as a starter as a sophomore in 2020. He had an interception in the 2020 ACC Championship Game against the Clemson Tigers. He was named First-Team All-ACC after recording 63 tackles, six pass breakups, and an interception.

Hamilton was the starter again in 2021, but due to a knee injury, he was sidelined after just seven games. He finished the season as consensus All-American who had 34 combined tackles (19 solo), three interceptions, and four pass deflections. On December 10, 2021, Hamilton declared for the 2022 NFL draft.

== Professional career ==
=== Pre-draft ===
Pre-draft measurables
| Height | Weight | Arm length | Hand span | Wingspan | 40-yard dash | 10-yard split | 20-yard split | 20-yard shuttle | Three-cone drill | Vertical jump | Broad jump |
|---|---|---|---|---|---|---|---|---|---|---|---|
| 6 ft 4 1/8 in (1.93 m) | 220 lb (100 kg) | 33 in (0.84 m) | 9 1/8 in (0.23 m) | 6 ft 7 3/4 in (2.03 m) | 4.59 s | 1.58 s | 2.67 s | 4.32 s | 6.90 s | 38.0 in (0.97 m) | 10 ft 11 in (3.33 m) |
All values from NFL Combine

Hamilton declared for the 2022 NFL draft after the 2021 season, where he was considered by some to be its best prospect.

=== 2022 season ===
Hamilton was selected by the Baltimore Ravens in the first round (14th overall) of the draft. He signed his rookie contract on June 7, 2022. He entered the 2022 season as the Ravens second-string safety. In his debut in Week 1 against the New York Jets, Hamilton had three solo tackles in a 24–9 win. In Week 3 against the New England Patriots, Hamilton forced the first fumble of his career. He also had three combined tackles (two solo) in a 37–26 win. Hamilton made his first sack and tackle for loss in a 23–20 win against the Cleveland Browns in Week 7. In Week 11 against the Carolina Panthers, Hamilton reinjured the same knee he injured in college. He was marked as inactive for their Week 12 game against Jacksonville Jaguars.

Hamilton played in 16 of the 17 games while starting in four. He finished the season with 62 total tackles (46 solo), two sacks, five pass deflections, and a forced fumble. After the season, he was named to the PFWA All-Rookie Team. In the AFC Wild Card Game against the Cincinnati Bengals, Hamilton had nine total tackles (five solo) as well as a forced and recovered fumble in a 24–17 loss.

=== 2023 season ===
Hamilton was named the starting strong safety for the 2023 season. In Week 3 against the Indianapolis Colts, Hamilton tied the NFL and broke the franchise record for sacks in the first half of a game with three. He also had nine tackles (seven solo), two tackles for loss, a forced fumble, and a pass deflection. However, the Ravens would end up losing 19–22. In their Week 4 game against the Browns, Hamilton caught the first interception of his NFL career while also recording five solo tackles and a pass deflection. This would seal their 28–3 victory. In Week 6 against the Tennessee Titans, Hamilton was ejected for targeting after hitting wide receiver Chris Moore in the head while he was defenseless. He was fined $20,524 for the hit.

In Week 10 against the Browns, Hamilton scored his first NFL touchdown when he tipped a pass from Deshaun Watson to himself to score an 18-yard pick-six to give the Ravens a 7–0 lead on the second play from scrimmage. However, the Ravens would end up losing 31–33. In Week 14 against the Los Angeles Rams, Hamilton bumped knees with wide receiver Puka Nacua, sidelining him for the remainder of the contest, which ended in 37–31 overtime victory. On Christmas Day in Week 16 against the San Francisco 49ers, Hamilton recorded two interceptions as the Ravens won 33–19. During the game, however, Hamilton again injured his knee in the fourth quarter and sat out the remainder of the win. Despite not finishing the game, he was named AFC Defensive Player of the Week. Before the Ravens' Week 17 game against the Miami Dolphins, Hamilton was ruled out. Before Week 18, Hamilton was named to the 2023 AFC Pro Bowl Team.

Hamilton played in 15 games during the 2023 season and started in all 15 of them. He tallied 81 total tackles (63 solo), 3.0 sacks, ten tackles for loss, 13 pass deflections, four interceptions, and a defensive touchdown. He was ranked 43rd by his fellow players on the NFL Top 100 Players of 2024.

=== 2024 season ===
Hamilton was again named as the starting safety for 2024 season. Uncharacteristically, the Ravens had one of the worst passing defenses in the NFL at the beginning of the season, although this was due to the poor play of Eddie Jackson and Marcus Williams, which put more stress on Hamilton. Both players were eventually replaced by Ar'Darius Washington, who solidified the defense into a much better unit. Hamilton had a solid season, finishing with a career-high 107 combined tackles, 2.0 sacks, an interception, nine pass deflections, two forced fumbles, and a fumble recovery. He was named to his second consecutive Pro Bowl on January 2, 2025. He was ranked 51st by his fellow players on the NFL Top 100 Players of 2025.

=== 2025 season ===
On April 30, 2025, the Ravens picked up the fifth-year option on Hamilton's contract. On August 27, he signed a four-year, $100.4 million contract extension that included $82 million guaranteed, the largest contract for a safety in NFL history. Hamilton was selected to his third consecutive Pro Bowl in December 2025. Pro Football Focus ranked him 9th in their list of the top 101 players of 2025.

== Career statistics ==
Legend
| | Led the league |
| **Bold** | Career high |

=== NFL ===
==== Regular season ====
| Year | Team | Games | | Tackles | | | | | Interceptions | | | | | | Fumbles | | |
| Year | Team | GP | GS | Cmb | Solo | Ast | Sck | TFL | PD | Int | Yds | Avg | Lng | TD | FF | FR | TD |
|---|---|---|---|---|---|---|---|---|---|---|---|---|---|---|---|---|---|
| 2022 | BAL | 16 | 4 | 62 | 46 | 16 | 2.0 | 4 | 5 | 0 | 0 | 0.0 | 0 | 0 | 1 | 0 | 0 |
| 2023 | BAL | 15 | 15 | 81 | 63 | 18 | **3.0** | **10** | **13** | **4** | **25** | **6.3** | **18** | **1** | 1 | 0 | 0 |
| 2024 | BAL | 17 | 17 | **107** | **77** | 30 | 2.0 | 4 | 9 | 1 | 1 | 0.0 | 0 | 0 | **2** | **1** | 0 |
| 2025 | BAL | 16 | 16 | 105 | 59 | **46** | 1.0 | 7 | 9 | 0 | 0 | 0.0 | 0 | 0 | **2** | 0 | 0 |
| 2026 | BAL | 9 | 9 | 62 | 43 | 17 | 0.0 | 9 | 5 | 1 | 2 | 2.0 | 2 | 0 | 1 | 0 | 0 |
| Career | | 76 | 63 | 443 | 288 | 139 | 8.0 | 36 | 38 | 10 | 25 | 5.0 | 18 | 1 | 7 | 1 | 0 |

==== Postseason ====
| Year | Team | Games | | Tackles | | | | | Interceptions | | | | | | Fumbles | | |
| Year | Team | GP | GS | Cmb | Solo | Ast | Sck | TFL | PD | Int | Yds | Avg | Lng | TD | FF | FR | TD |
|---|---|---|---|---|---|---|---|---|---|---|---|---|---|---|---|---|---|
| 2022 | BAL | 1 | 1 | 9 | 5 | 4 | 0.0 | 0 | 0 | 0 | 0 | 0.0 | 0 | 0 | **1** | **1** | 0 |
| 2023 | BAL | 2 | 2 | **14** | **12** | 2 | 0.0 | **1** | 0 | 0 | 0 | 0.0 | 0 | 0 | 0 | 0 | 0 |
| 2024 | BAL | 2 | 2 | 12 | 6 | **6** | 0.0 | 0 | 0 | 0 | 0 | 0.0 | 0 | 0 | 0 | 0 | 0 |
| Career | | 5 | 5 | 35 | 23 | 12 | 0.0 | 1 | 0 | 0 | 0 | 0.0 | 0 | 0 | 1 | 1 | 0 |

=== College ===
| Season | Team | GP | Tackles | | | | | Interceptions | | | | | Fumbles | | |
| Season | Team | GP | Solo | Ast | Cmb | TfL | Sck | Int | Yds | Avg | TD | PD | FR | FF | TD |
|---|---|---|---|---|---|---|---|---|---|---|---|---|---|---|---|
| 2019 | Notre Dame | 13 | 27 | 14 | 41 | 1.0 | 0.0 | **4** | **66** | **16.5** | **1** | **6** | 0 | 0 | 0 |
| 2020 | Notre Dame | 11 | **51** | 12 | **63** | **4.5** | 0.0 | 1 | 14 | 14.0 | 0 | **6** | 0 | 0 | 0 |
| 2021 | Notre Dame | 7 | 19 | **15** | 35 | 2.0 | 0.0 | 3 | 0 | 0.0 | 0 | 4 | 0 | 0 | 0 |
| Career | | 31 | 97 | 41 | 138 | 7.5 | 0.0 | 8 | 80 | 10.0 | 1 | 16 | 0 | 0 | 0 |

== Career highlights ==
=== Awards and honors ===
NFL

- 2× AP First-team All-Pro (2023, 2025)
- AP Second-team All-Pro (2024)
- 2× NFLPA First-team All-Pro (2023, 2024)
- 3× Pro Bowl (2023–2025)
- PFWA All-Rookie Team (2022)
- AFC Defensive Player of the Week (2023: Week 16)
- 3× NFL Top 100 — 43rd (2024), 51st (2025), 63rd (2026)

College

- Consensus All-American (2021)
- 2× FWAA First-team All-American (2020, 2021)
- 2× Phil Steele First-team All-American (2020, 2021)
- AFCA First-team All-American (2021)
- WCFF First-team All-American (2021)
- AFCA Second-team All-American (2020)
- WCFF Second-team All-American (2020)
- AP Second-team All-American (2021)
- The Athletic Second-team All-American (2020)
- CBS Sports Second-team All-American (2021)
- USA Today Second-team All-American (2021)
- AP Third-team All-American (2020)
- The Athletic Freshman All-American (2019)
- 2× Phil Steele First-team All-Independent (2019, 2021)
- PFF First-team All-Independent (2019)
- First-team All-ACC (2020)
- AP First-team All-ACC (2020)
- Phil Steele First-team All-ACC (2020)
- Notre Dame Echoes Co-Defensive Newcomer of the Year (2019)
- Lott IMPACT Trophy Player of the Week (2021: Week 1)
- Athlon Sports Defensive Player of the Week (2021: Week 3)
- WCFF Defensive Player of the Week (2021: Week 3)
- Bednarik Award Player of the Week (2021: Week 3)

=== Records ===
==== NFL records ====
- Most sacks in the first half of a game by a defensive back: 3 (tied) (September 24, 2023, vs. Indianapolis Colts)

==== Ravens franchise records ====
- Most sacks in the first half of a game: 3 (September 24, 2023, vs. Indianapolis Colts)
- Most interceptions in a single game: 2 (tied) (December 25, 2023, vs. San Francisco 49ers)

== Personal life ==
=== Podcast ===
In July 2021, Hamilton and Notre Dame teammates Cam Hart, Conor Ratigan, and KJ Wallace had a podcast, Inside The Garage.
