= Underclass All-American =

School/college sports awards in the United States

Underclass All-American is an honorific for high school and college athletes for excellence in competition. The athletes recognized with this title are considered the best players of a specific season in their sport that are members of a given class other than the senior class. These athletes are considered All-Americans for their class and are termed Junior All-Americans, Sophomore All-Americans and Freshman All-Americans or All-Freshman, All-Sophomore and All-Junior honorees.

== High school basketball ==
Annually, ESPN HS (formerly ESPN RISE) selected 30 juniors, 20 sophomores, and 10 freshmen as boys' high school basketball Underclass All-Americans. MaxPreps.com also chooses annual underclass All-American teams. These teams were called the Junior All-American Team, the Sophomore All-American Team and the Freshman All-American Team.

== High school football ==
ESPN HS chooses 25 non-senior high school football players as its Underclass All-Americans. MaxPreps selects an Underclass All-American team for juniors, sophomores, and freshmen, naming a national player of the year for each grade.

== College basketball ==
National Collegiate Athletic Association (NCAA) Division I men's college basketball Freshman All-American teams are chosen annually by rotating selectors. For the 2011–12 NCAA Division I season, Sporting News chose a Freshman All-American team. For the 2010–11 season, Collegeinsider.com chose a Freshman All-American team.

== College football ==
College Football News (CFN) chooses annual NCAA Division I men's college football Freshman All-American teams that it calls All-Freshman teams. In some years, CFN has chosen NCAA Division I men's college football Sophomore All-American teams. ESPN, 247Sports, Pro Football Focus, FWAA, Maxwell Football Club, On3 and The Athletic also publish Freshman All-American selections.

== College baseball ==
Collegiate Baseball presents the annual NCAA Division I men's college baseball Louisville Slugger Freshmen All-American team.
