= Ar'Darius Washington =

American football player (born 1999)

No. 24 – New York Giants
- Position: Safety
- Roster status: Active

Personal information
- Born: November 2, 1999 (age 27); Shreveport, Louisiana, U.S.
- Listed height: 5 ft 8 in (1.73 m)
- Listed weight: 180 lb (82 kg)

Career information
- High school: Evangel Christian (Shreveport, Louisiana)
- College: TCU (2018–2020)
- NFL draft: 2021: undrafted

Career history
- Baltimore Ravens (2021–2025); New York Giants (2026–present)

Awards and highlights
- Big 12 Defensive Freshman of the Year (2019); Freshman All-American (2019)

Career NFL statistics as of Week 10, 2026
- Total tackles: 113
- Sacks: 3.0
- Forced fumbles: 2
- Pass deflections: 14
- Interceptions: 3
- Stats at Pro Football Reference

Ar'Darius Washington (born November 2, 1999) is an American professional football safety for the New York Giants of the National Football League (NFL). He played college football for the TCU Horned Frogs.

== Early life ==
Washington attended Evangel Christian Academy in Shreveport, Louisiana, where he was a star cornerback for the Eagles. Prior to his senior season, he committed to play college football at LSU, but eventually switched his commitment to play at Texas Christian University in Fort Worth, Texas.

== College career ==
As a true freshman at TCU in 2018, Washington transitioned to safety and played in four games for the TCU Horned Frogs to preserve his redshirt. He enjoyed a breakout season as a redshirt freshman in 2019, becoming a starter late in the year and led the team with five interceptions - the most by any freshman under coach Gary Patterson in his tenure at TCU. After the season, he was named the Big 12 Defensive Freshman of the Year. and a Freshman All-American by the Football Writers Association of America.

Prior to Washington's sophomore season in 2020, he was named to the All-Texas College Team by Dave Campbell's Texas Football, as one of the top returning players in the Big 12 by ESPN and as the nation's second-leading returning safety behind his teammate Trevon Moehrig by Pro Football Focus. Additionally, he was projected as a first-round selection in the 2021 NFL draft by CBS Sports.

On December 29, 2020, Washington announced that he would forgo his final two seasons of collegiate eligibility by declaring for the 2021 NFL Draft.

== Professional career ==
Pre-draft measurables
Height	Weight	Arm length	Hand span	Wingspan	40-yard dash	10-yard split	20-yard split	20-yard shuttle	Three-cone drill	Vertical jump	Broad jump	Bench press
5 ft 8 1/4 in (1.73 m)	176 lb (80 kg)	29 1/4 in (0.74 m)	9 1/2 in (0.24 m)	5 ft 10 7/8 in (1.80 m)	4.61 s	1.62 s	2.66 s	4.10 s	7.06 s	37.5 in (0.95 m)	10 ft 7 in (3.23 m)	17 reps
All values from Pro Day

=== Baltimore Ravens ===
==== 2021–2023 ====
Washington signed with the Baltimore Ravens as an undrafted free agent on May 13, 2021. On November 27, 2021, Washington suffered a season-ending foot injury and was placed on injured reserve.

On August 30, 2022, Washington was waived by the Ravens and signed to the practice squad the next day. On December 11, in Week 14 of the 2022 NFL season against the Pittsburgh Steelers, Washington made his first two solo tackles. He was signed to the active roster on January 14, 2023.

Washington was placed on injured reserve on September 19, 2023, after suffering a chest injury in Week 2 against the Cincinnati Bengals. He was activated off IR on January 10, 2024.

==== 2024 ====
Washington started the 2024 season mainly on special teams, but his role on defense quickly increased after the poor play of Eddie Jackson and Marcus Williams caused the Ravens to have one of the worst passing defenses in the NFL to start the season. Washington was given the starting role for Week 8's game against the Cleveland Browns; the move ended up upgrading the safety position so significantly that he was given the starting job for the rest of the season. Both Williams and Jackson were benched with the latter being subsequently waived and the former being inactive for the final five games of the season. In Week 9, Washington recorded his first career interception off of Bo Nix in a 41–10 blowout win over the Denver Broncos. He recorded his second career interception in the waning moment of the Ravens' Week 15 35–14 rout of the New York Giants. The following week against the Pittsburgh Steelers, Washington forced a fumble by Russell Wilson, which was recovered by Kyle Van Noy. The turnover, which came early in the second quarter of a 7–7 tie game with the Steelers driving into the redzone, proved to be crucial as it swung the momentum back to Ravens in what would be a 34–17 win. He finished the season with career-highs in essentially every category.

==== 2025 ====
On April 21, 2025, Washington re-signed with the Ravens. On May 13, Washington reportedly tore his Achilles tendon, which resulted in him missing most of the 2025 season. He was activated on December 14, ahead of the team's Week 15 matchup against the Cincinnati Bengals.

=== New York Giants ===
On March 12, 2026, Washington signed a one-year, $3 million contract with the New York Giants.

== NFL career statistics ==
Legend
**Bold**	Career high

=== Regular season ===
Year	Team	Games		Tackles					Interceptions						Fumbles		
Year	Team	GP	GS	Cmb	Solo	Ast	Sck	TFL	PD	Int	Yds	Avg	Lng	TD	FF	FR	TD
2021	BAL	3	0	1	0	1	0.0	0	0	0	0	0.0	0	0	0	0	0
2022	BAL	3	0	2	2	0	0.0	0	0	0	0	0.0	0	0	0	0	0
2023	BAL	2	1	11	6	5	**1.0**	1	2	0	0	0.0	0	0	0	0	0
2024	BAL	16	9	**60**	**43**	**17**	**1.0**	**5**	**7**	**2**	**33**	**16.5**	**32**	0	**1**	0	0
2025	BAL	4	0	7	3	4	**1.0**	1	0	0	0	0	0	0	**1**	0	0
2026	NYG	6	6	18	14	4	0.0	0	0	0	0	0.0	0	0	0	0	0
Career		36	16	94	68	31	3.0	7	9	2	33	16.5	32	0	2	0	0
