= Damarion Williams =

American football player (born 1998)

No. 26 – Los Angeles Rams
- Position: Cornerback
- Roster status: Practice squad

Personal information
- Born: July 15, 1998 (age 28); Miami, Florida, U.S.
- Listed height: 5 ft 10 in (1.78 m)
- Listed weight: 183 lb (83 kg)

Career information
- High school: Community Christian School (Stockbridge, Georgia)
- College: Highland CC (2017–2018); Houston (2019–2021)
- NFL draft: 2022: 4th round, 141st overall pick

Career history
- Baltimore Ravens (2022–2024); Seattle Seahawks (2024)*; Tampa Bay Buccaneers (2025–2026)*; Los Angeles Rams (2026–present)
- * Offseason or practice squad member only

Career NFL statistics as of Week 9, 2026
- Total tackles: 25
- Pass deflections: 2
- Stats at Pro Football Reference

Damarion "Pepe" Williams (born July 15, 1998) is an American professional football cornerback for the Los Angeles Rams of the National Football League (NFL). He played college football for the Highland Scotties and Houston Cougars.

== Professional career ==
Pre-draft measurables
Height	Weight	Arm length	Hand span	Wingspan	40-yard dash	10-yard split	20-yard split	20-yard shuttle	Three-cone drill	Vertical jump	Broad jump	Bench press
5 ft 10 1/4 in (1.78 m)	182 lb (83 kg)	29 5/8 in (0.75 m)	8 3/4 in (0.22 m)	6 ft 0 5/8 in (1.84 m)	4.53 s	1.53 s	2.59 s	4.14 s	7.03 s	34.5 in (0.88 m)	9 ft 10 in (3.00 m)	17 reps
All values from NFL Combine/Houston Pro Day

=== Baltimore Ravens ===
Williams was selected by the Baltimore Ravens in the fourth round (141st overall) of the 2022 NFL draft.

On August 31, 2023, Williams was placed on injured reserve. He was activated on December 12.

On August 27, 2024, Williams was waived by the Ravens. He was re-signed to the practice squad on October 8, but was released one week later.

=== Seattle Seahawks ===
On October 23, 2024, Williams was signed to the Seattle Seahawks' practice squad. He signed a reserve/future contract with Seattle on January 6, 2025. On August 26, Williams was waived by the Seahawks as part of final roster cuts.

=== Tampa Bay Buccaneers ===
On September 30, 2025, Williams signed with the Tampa Bay Buccaneers' practice squad. On January 8, 2026, he signed a reserve/futures contract with the Buccaneers.

On August 30, 2026, Williams was waived/injured by the Buccaneers. On September 3, Williams was waived by Tampa Bay from injured reserve.

=== Los Angeles Rams ===
On October 14, 2026, Williams signed with the Los Angeles Rams practice squad.
