= 2018 Baltimore Ravens season =

23rd season in franchise history

- Owner: Steve Bisciotti
- General manager: Ozzie Newsome
- Head coach: John Harbaugh
- Offensive coordinator: Marty Mornhinweg
- Defensive coordinator: Don Martindale
- Home stadium: M&T Bank Stadium

Results
- Record: 10–6
- Division place: 1st AFC North
- Playoffs: Lost Wild Card Playoffs (vs. Chargers) 17–23
- All-Pros: 3: K Justin Tucker (1st team); RG Marshal Yanda (2nd team); LB C.J. Mosley (2nd team)
- Pro Bowlers: 4: G Marshal Yanda; DT Brandon Williams; MLB C.J. Mosley; FS Eric Weddle

Uniform
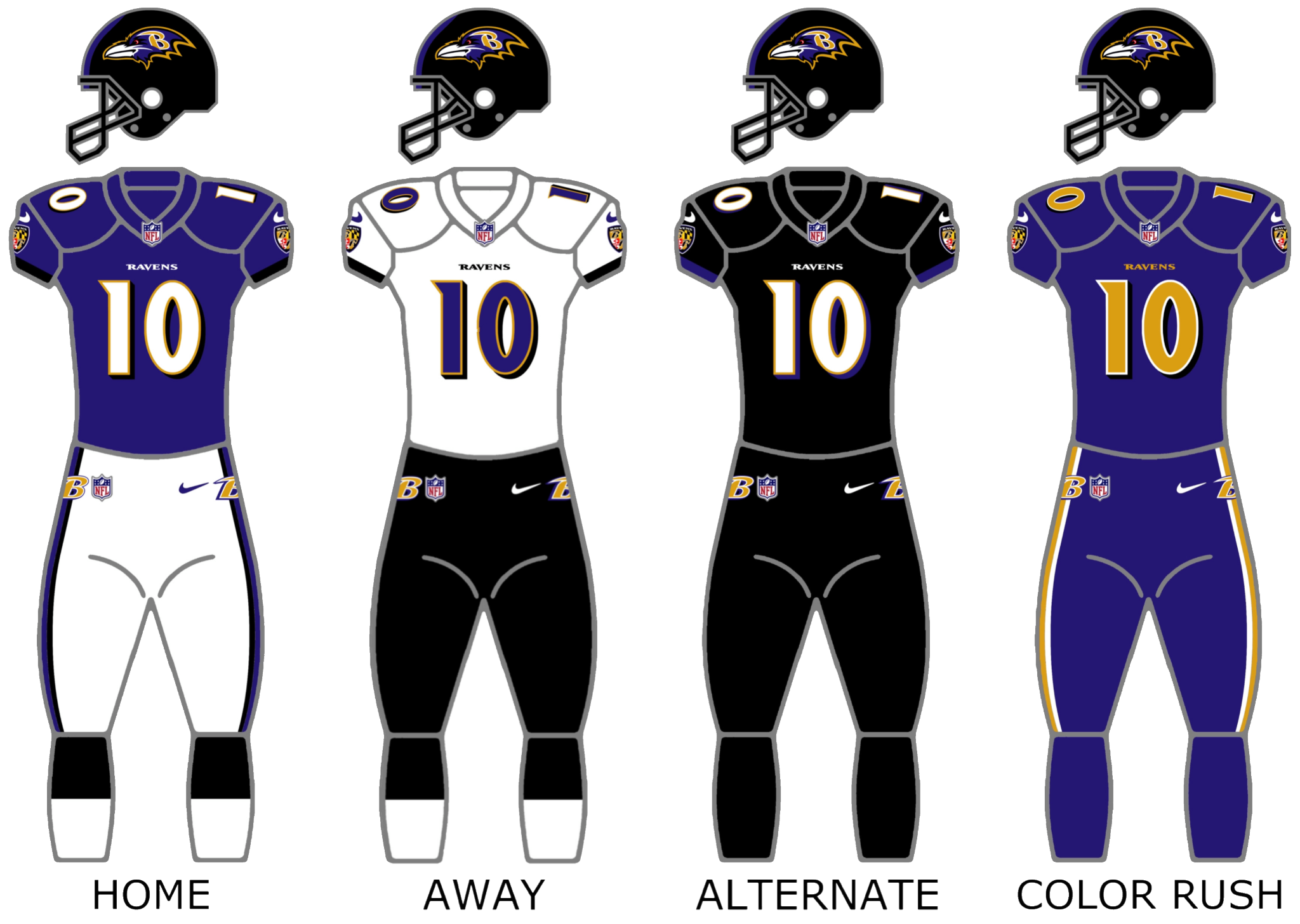

The 2018 season was the Baltimore Ravens' 23rd in the National Football League (NFL), their 11th under head coach John Harbaugh, and their 17th and final season under general manager Ozzie Newsome.

In Week 6, the Ravens set a franchise record, sacking Tennessee Titans quarterback Marcus Mariota 11 times in a 21–0 win.

After struggling to a 4–5 start, the Ravens went on a 6–1 run to finish 10–6 on the season, thanks to the emergence of rookie quarterback Lamar Jackson, who replaced longtime QB Joe Flacco due to injury. The Ravens clinched the AFC North after defeating the Cleveland Browns in Week 17, reaching the playoffs for the first time since 2014 and winning their division for the first time since 2012; they also finished the regular season ranked first in total defense. However they lost to the Los Angeles Chargers 23–17 in the Wild Card playoffs, which was the first time since 2006 that the Ravens went one-and-done and their first Wild Card playoff loss since 2003.

== Draft ==
External videos
- Ravens draft Hayden Hurst Ravens video
- Ravens draft Lamar Jackson Ravens video
- Ravens draft Orlando Brown, Jr. NFL video
- Ravens draft Mark Andrews NFL video
- Ravens draft Kenny Young NFL video
- Ravens draft Jaleel Scott Ravens video
- Ravens draft Anthony Averett Ravens video

2018 Baltimore Ravens draft
Round	Pick	Player	Position	College	Notes
1	25	Hayden Hurst	TE	South Carolina	from Tennessee
1	32	Lamar Jackson *	QB	Louisville	from Philadelphia
3	83	Orlando Brown Jr. *	OT	Oklahoma	
3	86	Mark Andrews *	TE	Oklahoma	from Kansas City
4	118	Anthony Averett	CB	Alabama	
4	122	Kenny Young	ILB	UCLA	from Kansas City
4	132	Jaleel Scott	WR	New Mexico State	from Philadelphia
5	162	Jordan Lasley	WR	UCLA	from Tennessee
6	190	DeShon Elliott	S	Texas	
6	212	Greg Senat	OT	Wagner	from Oakland
6	215	Bradley Bozeman	C	Alabama	from Tennessee
7	238	Zach Sieler	DE	Ferris State	from Arizona
Made roster † Pro Football Hall of Fame * Made at least one Pro Bowl during career

Draft trades

- The Ravens traded their second- and fourth-round selections (52nd and 125th) and a second-round selection in the 2019 NFL draft to Philadelphia in exchange for their first- and fourth-round selections (32nd and 132nd).
- The Ravens traded their first- and fifth-round selections (16th and 154th) to Buffalo in exchange for Buffalo's first and third round selections (22nd and 65th).
- The Ravens traded their first- and sixth-round selections (22nd and 215th) to Tennessee in exchange for Tennessee's first- and fourth-round selections (25th and 125th).
- The Ravens traded their third-round selection (75th) to Kansas City in exchange for Kansas City's third- and fourth-round selections (86th and 122nd).
- The Ravens traded their fifth-round selection (152nd) to Tennessee in exchange for Tennessee's fifth- and sixth-round selections (162nd and 215th).
- The Ravens traded this third-round selection (65th) to Oakland in exchange for Oakland's third-, fifth-, and sixth-round selections (75th, 152nd, and 212th).
- The Ravens traded a seventh-round selection (238th) to Arizona in exchange for center Tony Bergstrom, the pick later traded back to the Ravens.
- The Ravens were awarded a sixth-round compensatory pick (215th overall); later traded to Tennessee, then traded back to the Ravens.

== Staff ==
2018 Baltimore Ravens staff
Front office: Owner – Steve Bisciotti; President – Dick Cass; Executive vice president/general manager – Ozzie Newsome; Assistant general manager – Eric DeCosta; Senior vice president of football administration – Pat Moriarty; Director of pro personnel – Vince Newsome; Director of college scouting – Joe Hortiz; Director of football administration – Jessica Markison; Senior personnel assistant – George Kokinis; Assistant director of pro personnel – Chad Alexander; Head coaches: Head coach – John Harbaugh; Assistant head coach/interim offensive coordinator – Greg Roman; Assistant to the head coach – Dan Parsons; Offensive coaches: Offensive coordinator – Marty Mornhinweg; Quarterbacks – James Urban; Running backs – Thomas Hammock; Wide receivers – Bobby Engram; Wide receivers – Matt Weiss; Tight ends/offensive assistant– Andy Bischoff; Offensive line – Joe D'Alessandris; Assistant offensive line – Richard Angulo; Senior offensive assistant – Craig Ver Steeg; Offensive assistant – T. J. Weist	Defensive coaches: Defensive coordinator – Don Martindale; Defensive line – Joe Cullen; Assistant defensive line/outside linebackers – Drew Wilkins; Linebackers –Mike MacDonald; Secondary – Chris Hewitt; Defensive quality control – Sterling Lucas; Defensive staff assistant – Brian Duker; Defensive staff assistant – Jesse Minter; Special teams coaches: Associate head coach/special teams coordinator – Jerry Rosburg; Assistant special teams – Chris Horton; Specialist – Randy Brown; Strength and conditioning: Strength and conditioning – Juney Barnett; Performance coach – Steve Saunders; Staff assistant – performance – Brian Ellis; Staff assistant – performance – Ron Shrift; Staff assistant – performance – Travis Switzer; Analytics assistant – performance – Sam Rosengarten

== Final roster ==
2018 Baltimore Ravens roster
Quarterbacks (QB): 5 Joe Flacco; 3 Robert Griffin III; 8 Lamar Jackson; Running backs (RB): 37 Javorius Allen; 30 Kenneth Dixon; 35 Gus Edwards; 88 Ty Montgomery; 42 Patrick Ricard; Wide receivers (WR): 13 John Brown; 15 Michael Crabtree; 17 Jordan Lasley; 10 Chris Moore; 83 Willie Snead; Tight ends (TE): 89 Mark Andrews; 86 Nick Boyle; 81 Hayden Hurst; 87 Maxx Williams	Offensive linemen (OL): 77 Bradley Bozeman G/C; 78 Orlando Brown T; 71 Jermaine Eluemunor T/G; 74 James Hurst T/G; 72 Alex Lewis G; 68 Matt Skura C; 79 Ronnie Stanley T; 73 Marshal Yanda G; Defensive linemen (DL): 97 Michael Pierce NT; 95 Zach Sieler DE; 96 Brent Urban DE; 98 Brandon Williams NT; 93 Chris Wormley DE	Linebackers (LB): 49 Chris Board ILB; 54 Tyus Bowser OLB; 99 Matthew Judon OLB; 57 C. J. Mosley ILB; 48 Patrick Onwuasor ILB; 90 Za'Darius Smith OLB; 55 Terrell Suggs OLB; 56 Tim Williams OLB; 40 Kenny Young ILB; Defensive backs (DB): 28 Anthony Averett CB; 26 Maurice Canady CB; 24 Brandon Carr CB; 36 Chuck Clark S; 29 Marlon Humphrey CB; 23 Tony Jefferson SS; 27 Cyrus Jones CB; 41 Anthony Levine SS; 22 Jimmy Smith CB; 32 Eric Weddle FS; 25 Tavon Young CB; Special teams (ST): 46 Morgan Cox LS; 4 Sam Koch P; 9 Justin Tucker K	Practice squad: 63 Kofi Amichia G; 60 Randin Crecelius G; 31 Robertson Daniel CB; 39 Tyler Ervin RB; 45 Christopher Ezeala FB (IPP); 84 Janarion Grant WR; 33 Bennett Jackson FS; 58 Alvin Jones ILB; 82 Nick Keizer TE; 70 Jake Rodgers T; 14 Tim White WR; Reserve: 16 Quincy Adeboyejo WR (PUP); 53 Bam Bradley ILB (PUP); 34 Alex Collins RB (IR); 21 DeShon Elliott FS (IR); 69 Willie Henry DE (IR); 43 Jaylen Hill CB (PUP); 38 Stanley Jean-Baptiste CB (IR); 12 Jaleel Scott WR (IR); 64 Greg Senat T (IR); 47 De'Lance Turner RB (IR); 6 Kaare Vedvik K (NF-Inj.); Rookies in italics 53 active, 11 reserve, 11 practice squad

== Preseason ==
=== Schedule ===
On February 13, the NFL announced that the Ravens will play the Chicago Bears in the Pro Football Hall of Fame Game on Thursday, August 2, at the Tom Benson Hall of Fame Stadium in Canton, Ohio. This made the Ravens the last NFL team to play in the Hall of Fame Game for the first time in franchise history.

The remainder of the Ravens' preseason opponents and schedule were announced on April 11, 2018.

Week	Date	Opponent	Result	Record	Venue	Recap
HOF	August 2	vs. Chicago Bears	W 17–16	1–0	Tom Benson Hall of Fame Stadium (Canton)	Recap
1	August 9	Los Angeles Rams	W 33–7	2–0	M&T Bank Stadium	Recap
2	August 20	at Indianapolis Colts	W 20–19	3–0	Lucas Oil Stadium	Recap
3	August 25	at Miami Dolphins	W 27–10	4–0	Hard Rock Stadium	Recap
4	August 30	Washington Redskins	W 30–20	5–0	M&T Bank Stadium	Recap

== Regular season ==
=== Schedule ===
The Ravens' 2018 schedule was announced on April 19.

Week	Date	Opponent	Result	Record	Venue	Recap
1	September 9	Buffalo Bills	**W** 47–3	1–0	M&T Bank Stadium	Recap
2	September 13	at **Cincinnati Bengals**	**L** 23–34	1–1	Paul Brown Stadium	Recap
3	September 23	Denver Broncos	**W** 27–14	2–1	M&T Bank Stadium	Recap
4	September 30	at **Pittsburgh Steelers**	**W** 26–14	3–1	Heinz Field	Recap
5	October 7	at **Cleveland Browns**	**L** 9–12 (OT)	3–2	FirstEnergy Stadium	Recap
6	October 14	at Tennessee Titans	**W** 21–0	4–2	Nissan Stadium	Recap
7	October 21	New Orleans Saints	**L** 23–24	4–3	M&T Bank Stadium	Recap
8	October 28	at Carolina Panthers	**L** 21–36	4–4	Bank of America Stadium	Recap
9	November 4	**Pittsburgh Steelers**	**L** 16–23	4–5	M&T Bank Stadium	Recap
10	Bye					
11	November 18	**Cincinnati Bengals**	**W** 24–21	5–5	M&T Bank Stadium	Recap
12	November 25	Oakland Raiders	**W** 34–17	6–5	M&T Bank Stadium	Recap
13	December 2	at Atlanta Falcons	**W** 26–16	7–5	Mercedes-Benz Stadium	Recap
14	December 9	at Kansas City Chiefs	**L** 24–27 (OT)	7–6	Arrowhead Stadium	Recap
15	December 16	Tampa Bay Buccaneers	**W** 20–12	8–6	M&T Bank Stadium	Recap
16	December 22	at Los Angeles Chargers	**W** 22–10	9–6	StubHub Center	Recap
17	December 30	**Cleveland Browns**	**W** 26–24	10–6	M&T Bank Stadium	Recap

Note: Intra-division opponents are in bold text.

=== Game summaries ===
==== Week 1: Baltimore Ravens 47, Buffalo Bills 3 ====
Week 1: Buffalo Bills at Baltimore Ravens – Game summary

Quarter	1	2	3	4	Total
Bills	0	0	3	0	**3**
**Ravens**	14	12	14	7	**47**

at M&T Bank Stadium, Baltimore, Maryland

- Date: September 9
- Game time: 1:00 p.m. EDT
- Game weather: 61 °F (16 °C), rain
- Game attendance: 70,591
- Referee: Shawn Hochuli
- TV announcers (CBS): Kevin Harlan, Rich Gannon, and Steve Tasker
- Recap, Gamebook

Game information

**First quarter**

- BAL – Alex Collins 8-yard run (Justin Tucker kick), 8:42. Ravens 7–0. **Drive: 10 plays, 80 yards, 6:18.**
- BAL – John Brown 7-yard pass from Joe Flacco (Justin Tucker kick), 1:32. Ravens 14–0. **Drive: 10 plays, 66 yards, 3:59.**

**Second quarter**

- BAL – Justin Tucker 41-yard field goal, 13:14. Ravens 17–0. **Drive: 4 plays, 13 yards, 0:49.**
- BAL – Justin Tucker 39-yard field goal, 4:16. Ravens 20–0. **Drive: 4 plays, 8 yards, 1:22.**
- BAL – Michael Crabtree 12-yard pass from Joe Flacco (pass failed), 0:13. Ravens 26–0. **Drive: 9 plays, 85 yards, 2:35.**

**Third quarter**

- BAL – Willie Snead 13-yard pass from Joe Flacco (Justin Tucker kick), 12:28. Ravens 33–0. **Drive: 3 plays, 14 yards, 1:20.**
- BAL – Javorius Allen 1-yard run (Justin Tucker kick), 11:22. Ravens 40–0. **Drive: 1 plays, 1 yards, 0:04.**
- BUF – Steven Hauschka 35-yard field goal, 2:38. Ravens 40–3. **Drive: 12 plays, 46 yards, 5:31.**

**Fourth quarter**

- BAL – Kenneth Dixon 2-yard run (Justin Tucker kick), 3:52. Ravens 47–3. **Drive: 13 plays, 89 yards, 8:03.**

**Top passers**

- BUF – Josh Allen – 6/15, 74 yards
- BAL – Joe Flacco – 25/34, 236 yards, 3 TD

**Top rushers**

- BUF – Marcus Murphy – 6 carries, 31 yards
- BAL – Kenneth Dixon – 13 carries, 44 yards, TD

**Top receivers**

- BUF – Zay Jones – 3 receptions, 26 yards
- BAL – Willie Snead – 4 receptions, 49 yards, TD

In a blowout win over the Bills, Ravens QB Joe Flacco passed for three touchdowns before being relieved by rookie Lamar Jackson, while Bills QB Nathan Peterman was benched for rookie Josh Allen after posting a 0.0 passer rating.

==== Week 2: Cincinnati Bengals 34, Baltimore Ravens 23 ====
Week 2: Baltimore Ravens at Cincinnati Bengals – Game summary

Quarter	1	2	3	4	Total
Ravens	0	14	3	6	**23**
**Bengals**	14	14	0	6	**34**

at Paul Brown Stadium, Cincinnati, Ohio

- Date: September 13
- Game time: 8:20 p.m. EDT
- Game weather: 82 °F (28 °C), clear
- Game attendance: 50,018
- Referee: Walt Anderson
- TV announcers (NFLN/WBAL): Joe Buck, Troy Aikman, Erin Andrews, Kristina Pink, and Mike Pereira
- Recap, Gamebook

Game information

**First quarter**

- CIN – A. J. Green 4-yard pass from Andy Dalton (Randy Bullock kick), 10:35. Bengals 7–0. **Drive: 4 plays, 16 yards, 1:38.**
- CIN – A. J. Green 32-yard pass from Andy Dalton (Randy Bullock kick), 6:33. Bengals 14–0. **Drive: 5 plays, 80 yards, 1:33.**

**Second quarter**

- CIN – A. J. Green 7-yard pass from Andy Dalton (Randy Bullock kick), 13:02. Bengals 21–0. **Drive: 12 plays, 72 yards, 5:53.**
- BAL – Javorius Allen 1-yard run (Justin Tucker kick), 8:20. Bengals 21–7. **Drive: 10 plays, 75 yards, 4:42.**
- CIN – Tyler Boyd 14-yard pass from Andy Dalton (Randy Bullock kick), 2:58. Bengals 28–7. **Drive: 12 plays, 78 yards, 5:22.**
- BAL – Mark Andrews 1-yard pass from Joe Flacco (Justin Tucker kick), 0:08. Bengals 28–14. **Drive: 7 plays, 81 yards, 0:54.**

**Third quarter**

- BAL – Justin Tucker 55-yard field goal, 12:35. Bengals 28–17. **Drive: 5 plays, 28 yards, 1:06.**

**Fourth quarter**

- BAL – John Brown 21-yard pass from Joe Flacco (pass failed), 9:35. Bengals 28–23. **Drive: 12 plays, 87 yards, 5:15.**
- CIN – Randy Bullock 28-yard field goal, 3:03. Bengals 31–23. **Drive: 10 plays, 65 yards, 6:36.**
- CIN – Randy Bullock 40-yard field goal, 2:29. Bengals 34–23. **Drive: 4 plays, 7 yards, 0:17.**

**Top passers**

- BAL – Joe Flacco – 32/55, 376 yards, 2 TD, 2 INT
- CIN – Andy Dalton – 24/42, 265 yards, 4 TD

**Top rushers**

- BAL – Alex Collins – 9 carries, 35 yards
- CIN – Joe Mixon – 21 carries, 84 yards

**Top receivers**

- BAL – John Brown – 4 receptions, 92 yards, TD
- CIN – Tyler Boyd – 6 receptions, 91 yards, TD

==== Week 3: Baltimore Ravens 27, Denver Broncos 14 ====
Week 3: Denver Broncos at Baltimore Ravens – Game summary

Quarter	1	2	3	4	Total
Broncos	14	0	0	0	**14**
**Ravens**	10	10	7	0	**27**

at M&T Bank Stadium, Baltimore, Maryland

- Date: September 23
- Game time: 1:00 p.m. EDT
- Game weather: 61 °F (16 °C), light rain
- Game attendance: 70,156
- Referee: Ronald Torbert
- TV announcers (CBS): Andrew Catalon, James Lofton, and Jane Slater
- Recap, Gamebook

Game information

**First quarter**

- DEN – Royce Freeman 6-yard run (Brandon McManus kick), 13:29. Broncos 7–0. **Drive: 1 play, 6 yards, 0:04.**
- BAL – Alex Collins 6-yard run (Justin Tucker kick), 10:57. Tied 7–7. **Drive: 5 plays, 48 yards, 2:32.**
- DEN – Emmanuel Sanders 35-yard run (Brandon McManus kick), 7:02. Broncos 14–7. **Drive: 8 plays, 70 yards, 3:55.**
- BAL – Justin Tucker 52-yard field goal, 3:38. Broncos 14–10. **Drive: 8 plays, 40 yards, 3:24.**

**Second quarter**

- * BAL – Javorius Allen 12-yard pass from Joe Flacco (Justin Tucker kick), 8:26. Ravens 17–14. **Drive: 9 plays, 52 yards, 3:49.**
- BAL – Justin Tucker 52-yard field goal, 0:00. Ravens 20–14. **Drive: 4 plays, 16 yards, 0:26.**

**Third quarter**

- BAL – Javorius Allen 1-yard run (Justin Tucker kick), 7:26. Ravens 27–14. **Drive: 14 plays, 82 yards, 6:19.**

**Fourth quarter**

- No scoring plays.

**Top passers**

- DEN – Case Keenum – 22/34, 192 yards, INT
- BAL – Joe Flacco – 25/40, 277 yards, TD

**Top rushers**

- DEN – Royce Freeman – 13 carries, 53 yards, TD
- BAL – Alex Collins – 18 carries, 68 yards, TD

**Top receivers**

- DEN – Demaryius Thomas – 5 receptions, 63 yards
- BAL – John Brown – 5 receptions, 86 yards

==== Week 4: Baltimore Ravens 26, Pittsburgh Steelers 14 ====
Week 4: Baltimore Ravens at Pittsburgh Steelers – Game summary

Quarter	1	2	3	4	Total
**Ravens**	14	0	3	9	**26**
Steelers	0	14	0	0	**14**

at Heinz Field, Pittsburgh, Pennsylvania

- Date: September 30
- Game time: 8:20 p.m. EDT
- Game weather: 69 °F (21 °C), clear
- Game attendance: 62,030
- Referee: Tony Corrente
- TV announcers (NBC): Al Michaels, Cris Collinsworth, Michele Tafoya, and Terry McAulay
- Recap, Gamebook

Game information

**First quarter**

- BAL – John Brown – 33-yard TD pass from Joe Flacco. (Justin Tucker kick), 10:45. Ravens 7–0. **Drive: 8 plays, 75 yards, 4:15.**
- BAL – Alex Collins – 3-yard TD pass from Joe Flacco. (Justin Tucker kick), 8:03. Ravens 14–0. **Drive: 4 plays, 31 yards, 1:56.**

**Second quarter**

- PIT – Chris Boswell – 34-yard field goal, 14:07. Ravens 14–3. **Drive: 12 plays, 69 yards, 5:26.**
- PIT – Chris Boswell – 39-yard field goal, 6:26. Ravens 14–6. **Drive: 14 plays, 79 yards, 6:13.**
- PIT – Antonio Brown – 26 yard TD pass from Ben Roethlisberger, 2:50. (Ben Roethlisberger pass to James Conner for two-point conversion). Tied 14–14. **Drive: 5 plays, 76 yards, 1:58.**

**Third quarter**

- BAL – Justin Tucker – 47-yard field goal, 2:50. Ravens 17–14. **Drive: 12 plays, 51 yards, 3:26.**

**Fourth quarter**

- BAL – Justin Tucker – 49-yard field goal, 11:52. Ravens 20–14. **Drive: 11 plays, 37 yards, 6:15.**
- BAL – Justin Tucker – 28-yard field goal, 3:37. Ravens 23–14. **Drive: 14 plays, 82 yards, 6:40.**
- BAL – Justin Tucker – 31-yard field goal, 1:56. Ravens 26–14. **Drive: 5 plays, 14 yards, 1:19.**

**Top passers**

- BAL – Joe Flacco – 28/42, 363 yards, 2 TD
- PIT – Ben Roethlisberger – 27/47, 274 yards, TD, INT

**Top rushers**

- BAL – Alex Collins – 11 carries, 42 yards
- PIT – James Conner – 9 carries, 19 yards

**Top receivers**

- BAL – John Brown – 3 receptions, 116 yards, TD
- PIT – Antonio Brown – 5 receptions, 62 yards, TD

==== Week 5: Cleveland Browns 12, Baltimore Ravens 9 (OT) ====
Week 5: Baltimore Ravens at Cleveland Browns – Game summary

Quarter	1	2	3	4	OT	Total
Ravens	3	0	3	3	0	**9**
**Browns**	0	6	3	0	3	**12**

at FirstEnergy Stadium, Cleveland, Ohio

- Date: October 7
- Game time: 1:00 p.m. EDT
- Game weather: 72 °F (22 °C), cloudy
- Game attendance: 67,431
- Referee: Clay Martin
- TV announcers (CBS): Andrew Catalon, James Lofton, and John Schriffen
- Recap, Gamebook

Game information

**First quarter**

- BAL – Justin Tucker 44-yard field goal, 8:37. Ravens 3–0. **Drive: 4 plays, 7 yards, 0:56.**

**Second quarter**

- CLE – Rashard Higgins 19-yard pass from Baker Mayfield (PAT failed), 0:40. Browns 6–3. **Drive: 6 plays, 78 yards, 1:19.**

**Third quarter**

- CLE – Greg Joseph 35-yard field goal, 7:29. Browns 9–3. **Drive: 8 plays, 25 yards, 2:59.**
- BAL – Justin Tucker 25-yard field goal, 0:53. Browns 9–6. **Drive: 13 plays, 68 yards, 6:36.**

**Fourth quarter**

- BAL – Justin Tucker 32-yard field goal, 0:52. Tied 9–9. **Drive: 11 plays, 52 yards, 3:37.**

**Overtime**

- CLE – Greg Joseph 37-yard field goal, 0:02. Browns 12–9. **Drive: 7 plays, 65 yards, 2:55.**

**Top passers**

- BAL – Joe Flacco – 29/56, 298 yards, INT
- CLE – Baker Mayfield – 25/43, 342 yards, TD, INT

**Top rushers**

- BAL – Alex Collins – 12 rushes, 59 yards
- CLE – Carlos Hyde – 17 rushes, 63 yards

**Top receivers**

- BAL – Michael Crabtree – 6 receptions, 66 yards
- CLE – David Njoku – 6 receptions, 69 yards

==== Week 6: Baltimore Ravens 21, Tennessee Titans 0 ====
Week 6: Baltimore Ravens at Tennessee Titans – Game summary

Quarter	1	2	3	4	Total
**Ravens**	7	7	7	0	**21**
Titans	0	0	0	0	**0**

at Nissan Stadium, Nashville, Tennessee

- Date: October 14
- Game time: 4:25 p.m. EDT/3:25 p.m. CDT
- Game weather: 66 °F (19 °C), rain
- Game attendance: 64,441
- Referee: Carl Cheffers
- TV announcers (CBS): Kevin Harlan, Rich Gannon, and Steve Tasker
- Recap, Gamebook

Game information

**First quarter**

- BAL – Michael Crabtree 4-yard pass from Joe Flacco (Justin Tucker kick), 1:27. Ravens 7–0. **Drive: 17 plays, 94 yards, 9:09.**

**Second quarter**

- BAL – Alex Collins 13-yard run (Justin Tucker kick), 11:56. Ravens 14–0. **Drive: 7 plays, 52 yards, 2:53.**

**Third quarter**

- BAL – Alex Collins 2-yard run (Justin Tucker kick), 7:40. Ravens 21–0. **Drive: 12 plays, 78 yards, 7:20.**

**Fourth quarter**

- No scoring plays.

**Top passers**

- BAL – Joe Flacco – 25/37, 238 yards, TD, INT
- TEN – Marcus Mariota – 10/15, 117 yards

**Top rushers**

- BAL – Alex Collins – 19 rushes, 54 yards, 2 TDs
- TEN – Marcus Mariota – 2 rushes, 25 yards

**Top receivers**

- BAL – Michael Crabtree – 6 receptions, 93 yards, TD
- TEN – Tajae Sharpe – 2 receptions, 33 yards

==== Week 7: New Orleans Saints 24, Baltimore Ravens 23 ====
Week 7: New Orleans Saints at Baltimore Ravens – Game summary

Quarter	1	2	3	4	Total
**Saints**	0	7	0	17	**24**
Ravens	0	10	7	6	**23**

at M&T Bank Stadium, Baltimore, Maryland

- Date: October 21
- Game time: 4:05 p.m. EDT
- Game weather: 54 °F (12 °C), partly sunny
- Game attendance: 70,639
- Referee: John Parry
- TV announcers (Fox): Chris Myers, Daryl Johnston, and Laura Okmin
- Recap, Gamebook

Game information

First quarter

- No scoring plays.

Second quarter

- BAL – Justin Tucker 31-yard field goal, 6:04. Ravens 3–0. **Drive: 17 plays, 63 yards, 7:23.**
- NO – Benjamin Watson 1-yard pass from Drew Brees (Wil Lutz kick), 1:53. Saints 7–3. **Drive: 8 plays, 75 yards, 4:11.**
- BAL – Lamar Jackson 1-yard run (Justin Tucker kick), 0:04. Ravens 10–7. **Drive: 6 plays, 75 yards, 1:49.**

Third quarter

- BAL – Mark Andrews 8-yard pass from Joe Flacco (Justin Tucker kick), 3:30. Ravens 17–7. **Drive: 10 plays, 61 yards, 4:02.**

Fourth quarter

- NO – Alvin Kamara 2-yard run (Wil Lutz kick), 12:32. Ravens 17–14. **Drive: 12 plays, 75 yards, 5:58.**
- NO – Michael Thomas 5-yard pass from Drew Brees (Wil Lutz kick), 4:58. Saints 21–17. **Drive: 12 plays, 56 yards, 6:18.**
- NO – Wil Lutz 39-yard field goal, 2:07. Saints 24–17. **Drive: 7 plays, 43 yards, 1:12.**
- BAL – John Brown 14-yard pass from Joe Flacco (kick failed), 0:24. Saints 24–23. **Drive: 6 plays, 81 yards, 1:43.**

**Top passers**

- NO – Drew Brees – 22/30, 212 yards, 2 TDs
- BAL – Joe Flacco – 26/39, 279 yards, 2 TDs

**Top rushers**

- NO – Alvin Kamara – 17 rushes, 64 yards, TD
- BAL – Alex Collins – 11 rushes, 38 yards

**Top receivers**

- NO – Michael Thomas – 7 receptions, 69 yards, TD
- BAL – John Brown – 7 receptions, 134 yards, TD

==== Week 8: Carolina Panthers 36, Baltimore Ravens 21 ====
Week 8: Baltimore Ravens at Carolina Panthers – Game summary

Quarter	1	2	3	4	Total
Ravens	7	0	7	7	**21**
**Panthers**	7	17	3	9	**36**

at Bank of America Stadium, Charlotte, North Carolina

- Date: October 28
- Game time: 1:00 p.m. EDT
- Game weather: 61 °F (16 °C), sunny
- Game attendance: 73,843
- Referee: Pete Morelli
- TV announcers (CBS): Greg Gumbel, Trent Green, Bruce Arians, and Melanie Collins
- Recap, Gamebook

Game information

**First quarter**

- BAL – Alex Collins 13-yard run (Justin Tucker kick), 7:50. Ravens 7–0. **Drive: 11 plays, 75 yards, 7:10.**
- CAR – Christian McCaffrey 11-yard run (Graham Gano kick), 0:36. Tied 7–7. **Drive: 4 plays, 54 yards, 2:14.**

**Second quarter**

- CAR – Greg Olsen 11-yard pass from Cam Newton (Graham Gano kick), 13:25. Panthers 14–7. **Drive: 3 plays, 12 yards, 1:28.**
- CAR – Christian McCaffrey 6-yard pass from Cam Newton (Graham Gano kick), 3:45. Panthers 21–7. **Drive: 10 plays, 99 yards, 6:03.**
- CAR – Graham Gano 54-yard field goal, 0:00. Panthers 24–7. **Drive: 6 plays, 35 yards, 0:52.**

**Third quarter**

- CAR – Graham Gano 44-yard field goal, 2:58. Panthers 27–7. **Drive: 5 plays, 23 yards, 2:33.**
- BAL – Javorius Allen 9-yard pass from Joe Flacco (Justin Tucker kick), 0:10. Panthers 27–14. **Drive: 10 plays, 75 yards, 2:48.**

**Fourth quarter**

- CAR – Cam Newton 12-yard run (pass failed), 9:52. Panthers 33–14. **Drive: 9 plays, 85 yards, 5:18.**
- CAR – Graham Gano 30-yard field goal, 3:10. Panthers 36–14. **Drive: 11 plays, 42 yards, 5:41.**
- BAL – Hayden Hurst 26-yard pass from Lamar Jackson (Justin Tucker kick), 1:02. Panthers 36–21. **Drive: 7 plays, 64 yards, 2:08.**

**Top passers**

- BAL – Joe Flacco – 22/39, 192 yards, 1 TD, 2 INT
- CAR – Cam Newton – 21/29, 219 yards, 2 TD

**Top rushers**

- BAL – Alex Collins – 11 carries, 49 yards, 1 TD
- CAR – Cam Newton – 10 carries, 52 yards, 1 TD

**Top receivers**

- BAL – Willie Snead IV – 5 receptions, 54 yards
- CAR – D. J. Moore – 5 receptions, 90 yards

==== Week 9: Pittsburgh Steelers 23, Baltimore Ravens 16 ====
Week 9: Pittsburgh Steelers at Baltimore Ravens – Game summary

Quarter	1	2	3	4	Total
**Steelers**	7	7	6	3	**23**
Ravens	3	3	7	3	**16**

at M&T Bank Stadium, Baltimore, Maryland

- Date: November 4
- Game time: 1:00 p.m. EST
- Game weather: 55 °F (13 °C), sunny, windy
- Game attendance: 70,997
- Referee: Craig Wrolstad
- TV announcers (CBS): Ian Eagle, Dan Fouts, and Evan Washburn
- Recap, Gamebook

Game information

**First quarter**

- BAL – Justin Tucker 23-yard field goal, 5:02. Ravens 3–0. **Drive: 10 plays, 66 yards, 4:20.**
- PIT – James Conner 7-yard pass from Ben Roethlisberger (Chris Boswell kick), 1:03. Steelers 7–3. **Drive: 9 plays, 61 yards, 3:59.**

**Second quarter**

- PIT – Antonio Brown 6-yard pass from Ben Roethlisberger (Chris Boswell kick), 7:18. Steelers 14–3. **Drive: 12 plays, 75 yards, 5:46.**
- BAL – Justin Tucker 23-yard field goal, 4:37. Steelers 14–6. **Drive: 6 plays, 58 yards, 2:41.**

**Third quarter**

- PIT – Ben Roethlisberger 1-yard run (kick failed), 6:46. Steelers 20–6. **Drive: 15 plays, 75 yards, 8:14.**
- BAL – Alex Collins 1-yard run (Justin Tucker kick), 2:56. Steelers 20–13. **Drive: 11 plays, 75 yards, 3:50.**

**Fourth quarter**

- PIT – Chris Boswell 29-yard field goal, 8:26. Steelers 23–13. **Drive: 11 plays, 74 yards, 5:49.**
- BAL – Justin Tucker 37-yard field goal, 5:23. Steelers 23–16. **Drive: 9 plays, 56 yards, 3:03.**

**Top passers**

- PIT – Ben Roethlisberger – 28/47, 270 yards, 2 TD
- BAL – Joe Flacco – 23/37, 209 yards

**Top rushers**

- PIT – James Conner – 24 carries, 107 yards
- BAL – Alex Collins – 9 carries, 35 yards, 1 TD

**Top receivers**

- PIT – JuJu Smith-Schuster – 7 receptions, 78 yards
- BAL – Willie Snead IV – 7 receptions, 58 yards

After 10 years with the team, this would become Joe Flacco’s final start and last game as a Raven as he suffered a hip injury and was replaced by Lamar Jackson, who went on to start the final 7 games of the season. Flacco was ultimately traded to the Denver Broncos during the off-season.

==== Week 11: Baltimore Ravens 24, Cincinnati Bengals 21 ====
Week 11: Cincinnati Bengals at Baltimore Ravens – Game summary

Quarter	1	2	3	4	Total
Bengals	0	7	14	0	**21**
**Ravens**	7	6	8	3	**24**

at M&T Bank Stadium, Baltimore, Maryland

- Date: November 18
- Game time: 1:00 p.m. EST
- Game weather: 48 °F (9 °C), cloudy
- Game attendance: 70,077
- Referee: Walt Coleman
- TV announcers (CBS): Kevin Harlan, Rich Gannon, and Steve Tasker
- Recap, Gamebook

Game information

**First quarter**

- BAL – Alex Collins 7-yard run (Justin Tucker kick), 7:31. Ravens 7–0. **Drive: 11 plays, 75 yards, 5:23.**

**Second quarter**

- CIN – Joe Mixon 1-yard run (Randy Bullock kick), 12:57. Tied 7–7. **Drive: 6 plays, 57 yards, 2:06.**
- BAL – Justin Tucker 28-yard field goal, 1:46. Ravens 10–7. **Drive: 7 plays, 34 yards, 3:16.**
- BAL – Justin Tucker 56-yard field goal, 0:00. Ravens 13–7. **Drive: 4 plays, 27 yards, 0:22.**

**Third quarter**

- CIN – Matt Lengel 4-yard pass from Andy Dalton (Randy Bullock kick), 11:46. Bengals 14–13. **Drive: 4 plays, 32 yards, 1:50.**
- CIN – John Ross 22-yard pass from Andy Dalton (Randy Bullock kick), 5:45. Bengals 21–13. **Drive: 7 plays, 45 yards, 3:30.**
- BAL – Gus Edwards 11-yard run (Gus Edwards run), 1:03. Tied 21–21. **Drive: 10 plays, 80 yards, 4:42.**

**Fourth quarter**

- BAL – Justin Tucker 24-yard field goal, 8:12. Ravens 24–21. **Drive: 13 plays, 55 yards, 6:56.**

**Top passers**

- CIN – Andy Dalton – 19/36, 211 yards, 2 TDs
- BAL – Lamar Jackson – 13/19, 150 yards, 1 INT

**Top rushers**

- CIN – Andy Dalton – 2 carries, 29 yards
- BAL – Lamar Jackson – 27 carries, 117 yards

**Top receivers**

- CIN – Tyler Boyd – 4 receptions, 71 yards
- BAL – Willie Snead IV – 5 receptions, 51 yards

On his first drive as the starting quarterback for the Ravens, Lamar Jackson orchestrated an 11 play, 75 yard drive with Alex Collins running the ball in for a touchdown. During the drive Jackson did not throw a single pass but rushed 5 times for 46 yards.

==== Week 12: Baltimore Ravens 34, Oakland Raiders 17 ====
Week 12: Oakland Raiders at Baltimore Ravens – Game summary

Quarter	1	2	3	4	Total
Raiders	7	3	7	0	**17**
**Ravens**	3	10	7	14	**34**

at M&T Bank Stadium, Baltimore, Maryland

- Date: November 25
- Game time: 1:00 p.m. EST
- Game weather: 60 °F (16 °C), partly cloudy
- Game attendance: 70,035
- Referee: Clay Martin
- TV announcers (CBS): Andrew Catalon, James Lofton, and Amanda Balionis
- Recap, Gamebook

Game information

**First quarter**

- OAK – Doug Martin 1-yard rush (Daniel Carlson kick), 8:45. Raiders 7–0. **Drive: 12 plays, 81 yards, 6:15.**
- BAL – Justin Tucker 47-yard field goal, 4:28. Raiders 7–3. **Drive: 9 plays, 40 yards, 4:17.**

**Second quarter**

- BAL – Cyrus Jones 70-yard punt return (Justin Tucker kick), 12:45. Ravens 10–7.
- BAL – Justin Tucker 28-yard field goal, 7:11. Ravens 13–7. **Drive: 6 plays, 77 yards, 3:05.**
- OAK – Daniel Carlson 42-yard field goal, 2:34. Ravens 13–10. **Drive: 7 plays, 20 yards, 2:57.**

**Third quarter**

- BAL – Lamar Jackson 5-yard rush (Justin Tucker kick), 8:10. Ravens 20–10. **Drive: 13 plays, 57 yards, 6:50.**
- OAK – Jared Cook 16-yard pass from Derek Carr (Daniel Carlson kick), 5:09. Ravens 20–17. **Drive: 6 plays, 75 yards, 3:01.**

**Fourth quarter**

- BAL – Michael Crabtree 8-yard pass from Lamar Jackson (Justin Tucker kick), 11:16. Ravens 27–17. **Drive: 17 plays, 71 yards, 8:53.**
- BAL – Terrell Suggs 43-yard fumble return (Justin Tucker kick), 5:55. Ravens 34–17.

**Top passers**

- OAK – Derek Carr – 16/34, 194 yards, 1 TD
- BAL – Lamar Jackson – 14/25, 178 yards, 1 TD, 2 INT

**Top rushers**

- OAK – Doug Martin – 11 carries, 51 yards, 1 TD
- BAL – Gus Edwards – 23 carries, 118 yards

**Top receivers**

- OAK – Seth Roberts – 2 receptions, 54 yards
- BAL – Mark Andrews – 1 reception, 74 yards

==== Week 13: Baltimore Ravens 26, Atlanta Falcons 16 ====
Week 13: Baltimore Ravens at Atlanta Falcons – Game summary

Quarter	1	2	3	4	Total
**Ravens**	7	3	6	10	**26**
Falcons	3	7	0	6	**16**

at Mercedes-Benz Stadium, Atlanta, Georgia

- Date: December 2
- Game time: 1:00 p.m. EST
- Game weather: 67 °F (19 °C), mostly cloudy — retractable roof open
- Game attendance: 72,262
- Referee: Brad Allen
- TV announcers (CBS): Jim Nantz, Tony Romo, Tracy Wolfson, and Gene Steratore
- Recap, Gamebook

Game information

**First quarter**

- ATL – Matt Bryant 44-yard field goal, 9:32. Falcons 3–0. **Drive: 12 plays, 49 yards, 5:28.**
- BAL – Lamar Jackson 13-yard rush (Justin Tucker kick), 4:17. Ravens 7–3. **Drive: 9 plays, 75 yards, 5:15.**

**Second quarter**

- ATL – Vic Beasley 74-yard fumble return (Matt Bryant kick), 11:33. Falcons 10–7.
- BAL – Justin Tucker 41-yard field goal, 0:06. Tied 10–10. **Drive: 9 plays, 59 yards, 1:40.**

**Third quarter**

- BAL – Justin Tucker 21-yard field goal, 9:59. Ravens 13–10. **Drive: 10 plays, 72 yards, 5:01.**
- BAL – Justin Tucker 45-yard field goal, 0:31. Ravens 16–10. **Drive: 14 plays, 60 yards, 8:08.**

**Fourth quarter**

- BAL – Justin Tucker 47-yard field goal, 7:25. Ravens 19–10. **Drive: 13 plays, 55 yards, 6:38.**
- BAL – Tavon Young 12-yard fumble return (Justin Tucker kick), 7:16. Ravens 26–10.
- ATL – Austin Hooper 1-yard pass from Matt Ryan (pass failed), 4:18. Ravens 26–16. **Drive: 6 plays, 75 yards, 2:58.**

**Top passers**

- BAL – Lamar Jackson – 12/21, 125 yards
- ATL – Matt Ryan – 16/26, 131 yards, 1 TD

**Top rushers**

- BAL – Gus Edwards – 21 carries, 82 yards
- ATL – Ito Smith – 7 carries, 22 yards

**Top receivers**

- BAL – Mark Andrews – 3 receptions, 47 yards
- ATL – Austin Hooper – 5 receptions, 44 yards, 1 TD

==== Week 14: Kansas City Chiefs 27, Baltimore Ravens 24 (OT) ====
Week 14: Baltimore Ravens at Kansas City Chiefs – Game summary

Quarter	1	2	3	4	OT	Total
Ravens	0	10	7	7	0	**24**
**Chiefs**	7	10	0	7	3	**27**

at Arrowhead Stadium, Kansas City, Missouri

- Date: December 9
- Game time: 1:00 p.m. EST/12:00 p.m. CST
- Game weather: 27 °F (−3 °C), sunny
- Game attendance: 74,336
- Referee: Tony Corrente
- TV announcers (CBS): Jim Nantz, Tony Romo, Tracy Wolfson, and Gene Steratore
- Recap, Gamebook

Game information

**First quarter**

- KC – Damien Williams 1-yard rush (Harrison Butker kick), 3:03. Chiefs 7–0. **Drive: 10 plays, 75 yards, 5:41.**

**Second quarter**

- BAL – Kenneth Dixon 3-yard rush (Justin Tucker kick), 14:17. Tied 7–7. **Drive: 8 plays, 75 yards, 3:46.**
- BAL – Justin Tucker 28-yard field goal, 7:00. Ravens 10–7. **Drive: 10 plays, 49 yards, 4:37.**
- KC – Travis Kelce 15-yard pass from Patrick Mahomes (Harrison Butker kick), 2:37. Chiefs 14–10. **Drive: 9 plays, 75 yards, 4:23.**
- KC – Harrison Butker 24-yard field goal, 0:00. Chiefs 17–10. **Drive: 9 plays, 75 yards, 1:36.**

**Third quarter**

- BAL – Maxx Williams 10-yard pass from Lamar Jackson (Justin Tucker kick), 3:10. Tied 17–17. **Drive: 14 plays, 73 yards, 7:15.**

**Fourth quarter**

- BAL – John Brown 9-yard pass from Lamar Jackson (Justin Tucker kick), 4:04. Ravens 24–17. **Drive: 3 plays, 14 yards, 0:54.**
- KC – Damien Williams 5-yard pass from Patrick Mahomes (Harrison Butker kick), 0:53. Tied 24–24. **Drive: 11 plays, 75 yards, 3:11.**

**Overtime**

- KC – Harrison Butker 35-yard field goal, 4:42. Chiefs 27–24. **Drive: 11 plays, 58 yards, 5:18.**

**Top passers**

- BAL – Lamar Jackson – 13/24, 147 yards, 2 TD
- KC – Patrick Mahomes – 35/53, 377 yards, 2 TD, INT

**Top rushers**

- BAL – Lamar Jackson – 13 carries, 71 yards
- KC – Spencer Ware – 15 carries, 75 yards

**Top receivers**

- BAL – Willie Snead IV – 5 receptions, 61 yards
- KC – Tyreek Hill – 8 receptions, 139 yards

==== Week 15: Baltimore Ravens 20, Tampa Bay Buccaneers 12 ====
Week 15: Tampa Bay Buccaneers at Baltimore Ravens – Game summary

Quarter	1	2	3	4	Total
Buccaneers	0	9	3	0	**12**
**Ravens**	0	10	7	3	**20**

at M&T Bank Stadium, Baltimore, Maryland

- Date: December 16
- Game time: 1:00 p.m. EST
- Game weather: 43 °F (6 °C), cloudy, rain
- Game attendance: 70,031
- Referee: Ronald Torbert
- TV announcers (Fox): Dick Stockton, Mark Schlereth, and Jennifer Hale
- Recap, Gamebook

Game information

**First quarter**

- No scoring plays.

**Second quarter**

- TB – Peyton Barber 3-yard rush (rush failed), 12:08. Buccaneers 6–0. **Drive: 8 plays, 51 yards, 4:16.**
- BAL – Chris Moore 5-yard pass from Lamar Jackson (Justin Tucker kick), 3:58. Ravens 7–6. **Drive: 16 plays, 73 yards, 8:10.**
- TB – Cairo Santos 21-yard field goal, 1:48. Buccaneers 9–7. **Drive: 7 plays, 72 yards, 2:10.**
- BAL – Justin Tucker 24-yard field goal, 0:09. Ravens 10–9. **Drive: 6 plays, 83 yards, 1:39.**

**Third quarter**

- BAL – Gus Edwards 10-yard rush (Justin Tucker kick), 10:03. Ravens 17–9. **Drive: 10 plays, 78 yards, 4:57.**
- TB – Cairo Santos 28-yard field goal, 5:43. Ravens 17–12. **Drive: 4 plays, 5 yards, 2:06.**

**Fourth quarter**

- BAL – Justin Tucker 35-yard field goal, 13:32. Ravens 20–12. **Drive: 15 plays, 38 yards, 7:11.**

**Top passers**

- TB – Jameis Winston – 13/25, 157 yards, 1 INT
- BAL – Lamar Jackson – `14/23, 131 yards, 1 TD

**Top rushers**

- TB – Peyton Barber – 19 carries, 85 yards, 1 TD
- BAL – Gus Edwards – 19 carries, 104 yards, 1 TD

**Top receivers**

- TB – Mike Evans – 4 receptions, 121 yards
- BAL – Willie Snead IV – 5 receptions, 58 yards

==== Week 16: Baltimore Ravens 22, Los Angeles Chargers 10 ====
Week 16: Baltimore Ravens at Los Angeles Chargers – Game summary

Quarter	1	2	3	4	Total
**Ravens**	3	3	10	6	**22**
Chargers	0	3	7	0	**10**

at StubHub Center, Carson, California

- Date: December 22
- Game time: 8:20 p.m. EST/5:20 p.m. PST
- Game weather: 60 °F (16 °C), partly cloudy
- Game attendance: 25,571
- Referee: Clete Blakeman
- TV announcers (NFLN): Mike Tirico, Kurt Warner, and Peter Schrager
- Recap, Gamebook

Game information

**First quarter**

- BAL – Justin Tucker 24-yard field goal, 12:47. Ravens 3–0. **Drive: 5 plays, 46 yards, 2:04.**

**Second quarter**

- BAL – Justin Tucker 35-yard field goal, 2:54. Ravens 6–0. **Drive: 11 plays, 31 yards, 5:21.**
- LAC – Michael Badgley 38-yard field goal, 0:45. Ravens 6–3. **Drive: 9 plays, 56 yards, 2:10.**

**Third quarter**

- LAC – Melvin Gordon 1-yard run (Michael Badgley kick), 13:21. Chargers 10–6. **Drive: 3 plays, 17 yards, 1:26.**
- BAL – Mark Andrews 68-yard pass from Lamar Jackson (Justin Tucker kick), 12:28. Ravens 13–10. **Drive: 2 plays, 85 yards, 1:00.**
- BAL – Justin Tucker 56-yard field goal, 5:41. Ravens 16–10. **Drive: 7 plays, 30 yards, 3:31.**

**Fourth quarter**

- BAL – Tavon Young 62-yard fumble return (run failed), 2:40. Ravens 22–10.

**Top passers**

- BAL – Lamar Jackson – 12/22, 204 yards, TD
- LAC – Philip Rivers – 23/37, 181 yards, 2 INT

**Top rushers**

- BAL – Gus Edwards – 14 rushes, 92 yards
- LAC – Melvin Gordon – 12 rushes, 41 yards, TD

**Top receivers**

- BAL – Mark Andrews – 2 receptions, 83 yards, TD
- LAC – Keenan Allen – 5 receptions, 58 yards

==== Week 17: Baltimore Ravens 26, Cleveland Browns 24 ====
Week 17: Cleveland Browns at Baltimore Ravens – Game summary

Quarter	1	2	3	4	Total
Browns	7	0	7	10	**24**
**Ravens**	10	10	3	3	**26**

at M&T Bank Stadium, Baltimore, Maryland

- Date: December 30
- Game time: 4:25 p.m. EST
- Game weather: 48 °F (9 °C), partly cloudy
- Game attendance: 70,925
- Referee: Shawn Smith
- TV announcers (CBS): Jim Nantz, Tony Romo, Tracy Wolfson, and Gene Steratore
- Recap, Gamebook

Game information

**First quarter**

- BAL – Justin Tucker 38-yard field goal, 9:27. Ravens 3–0. **Drive: 9 plays, 41 yards, 3:27.**
- CLE – Breshad Perriman 28-yard pass from Baker Mayfield (Greg Joseph kick), 8:22. Browns 7–3. **Drive: 4 plays, 75 yards, 1:05.**
- BAL – Lamar Jackson 25-yard rush (Justin Tucker kick), 4:46. Ravens 10–7. **Drive: 7 plays, 69 yards, 3:36.**

**Second quarter**

- BAL – Lamar Jackson 8-yard rush (Justin Tucker kick), 14:54. Ravens 17–7. **Drive: 6 plays, 77 yards, 2:54.**
- BAL – Justin Tucker 35-yard field goal, 6:11. Ravens 20–7. **Drive: 8 plays, 64 yards, 6:12.**

**Third quarter**

- CLE – Jarvis Landry 48-yard pass from Baker Mayfield (Greg Joseph kick), 12:27. Ravens 20–14. **Drive: 1 plays, 48 yards, 0:08.**
- BAL – Justin Tucker 44-yard field goal, 7:02. Ravens 23–14. **Drive: 12 plays, 49 yards, 5:25.**

**Fourth quarter**

- CLE – Greg Joseph 35-yard field goal, 13:45. Ravens 23–17. **Drive: 9 plays, 60 yards, 4:08.**
- BAL – Justin Tucker 23-yard field goal, 7:20. Ravens 26–17. **Drive: 12 plays, 78 yards, 6:25.**
- CLE – Antonio Callaway 1-yard pass from Baker Mayfield (Greg Joseph kick), 3:24. Ravens 26–24. **Drive: 9 plays, 75 yards, 3:56.**

**Top passers**

- CLE – Baker Mayfield – 23/42, 376 yards, 3 TD, 3 INT
- BAL – Lamar Jackson – 14/24, 179 yards

**Top rushers**

- CLE – Nick Chubb – 9 carries, 24 yards
- BAL – Kenneth Dixon – 12 carries, 117 yards

**Top receivers**

- CLE – Jarvis Landry – 5 receptions, 102 yards, TD
- BAL – Mark Andrews – 4 receptions, 54 yards

Similar to last season, the Ravens' playoff hopes were decided on a 4th down in the waning seconds of the game. Browns QB Baker Mayfield made a quick throw that was picked by Ravens LB C.J. Mosley to seal the game for Baltimore, clinching them their first division title in 6 years and making the playoffs.

=== Standings ===
==== Division ====
AFC North
	W	L	T	PCT	DIV	CONF	PF	PA	STK
^{(4)} Baltimore Ravens	10	6	0	.625	3–3	8–4	389	287	W3
Pittsburgh Steelers	9	6	1	.594	4–1–1	6–5–1	428	360	W1
Cleveland Browns	7	8	1	.469	3–2–1	5–6–1	359	392	L1
Cincinnati Bengals	6	10	0	.375	1–5	4–8	368	455	L2

==== Conference ====
AFC
#	Team	Division	W	L	T	PCT	DIV	CONF	SOS	SOV	STK
**Division leaders**
1 (Note: Kansas City finished ahead of LA Chargers in the AFC West based on division record, claiming the No. 1 seed.)	Kansas City Chiefs	West	12	4	0	.750	5–1	10–2	.480	.401	W1
2 (Note: New England claimed the No. 2 seed over Houston based on head-to-head victory.)	New England Patriots	East	11	5	0	.688	5–1	8–4	.482	.494	W2
3	Houston Texans	South	11	5	0	.688	4–2	9–3	.471	.435	W1
4	Baltimore Ravens	North	10	6	0	.625	3–3	8–4	.496	.450	W3
**Wild Cards**
5	Los Angeles Chargers	West	12	4	0	.750	4–2	9–3	.477	.422	W1
6	Indianapolis Colts	South	10	6	0	.625	4–2	7–5	.465	.456	W4
**Did not qualify for the postseason**
7	Pittsburgh Steelers	North	9	6	1	.594	4–1–1	6–5–1	.504	.448	W1
8	Tennessee Titans	South	9	7	0	.563	3–3	5–7	.520	.465	L1
9	Cleveland Browns	North	7	8	1	.469	3–2–1	5–6–1	.516	.411	L1
10	Miami Dolphins	East	7	9	0	.438	4–2	6–6	.469	.446	L3
11 (Note: Denver finished ahead of Cincinnati and Buffalo based on strength of victory. Cincinnati finished ahead of Buffalo based on record vs. common opponents. Cincinnati's cumulative record against Baltimore, Indianapolis, the Los Angeles Chargers and Miami was 3–2, compared to Buffalo's 1–4 cumulative record against the same four teams.)	Denver Broncos	West	6	10	0	.375	2–4	4–8	.523	.464	L4
12	Cincinnati Bengals	North	6	10	0	.375	1–5	4–8	.535	.448	L2
13	Buffalo Bills	East	6	10	0	.375	2–4	4–8	.523	.411	W1
14	Jacksonville Jaguars	South	5	11	0	.313	1–5	4–8	.549	.463	L1
15 (Note: NY Jets finished ahead of Oakland based on strength of victory.)	New York Jets	East	4	12	0	.250	1–5	3–9	.506	.438	L3
16	Oakland Raiders	West	4	12	0	.250	1–5	3–9	.547	.406	L1
**Tiebreakers** (Note: When breaking ties for three or more teams under the NFL's rules, they are first broken within divisions, then comparing only the highest ranked remaining team from each division.)

== Postseason ==
=== Schedule ===
Round	Date	Opponent (seed)	Result	Record	Venue	Recap
Wild Card	January 6, 2019	Los Angeles Chargers (5)	L 17–23	0–1	M&T Bank Stadium	Recap

=== Game summaries ===
==== AFC Wild Card Round: vs (5) Los Angeles Chargers ====
Wild Card Round: (5) Los Angeles Chargers at (4) Baltimore Ravens – Game summary

Quarter	1	2	3	4	Total
Chargers	6	6	0	11	23
Ravens	0	0	3	14	17

at M&T Bank Stadium, Baltimore, Maryland

- Date: January 6, 2019
- Game time: 1:05 p.m. EST
- Game weather: 52 °F (11 °C), sunny
- Game attendance: 70,432
- Referee: Clete Blakeman
- TV announcers (CBS): Jim Nantz, Tony Romo, Tracy Wolfson and Jay Feely
- Recap, Gamebook

Game information

First quarter

- LAC – Michael Badgley 21-yard field goal, 6:59. Chargers 3-0. Drive: 5 plays, 12 yards, 2:36
- LAC – Michael Badgley 53-yard field goal, 1:08. Chargers 6-0. Drive: 4 plays, 7 yards, 2:13

Second quarter

- LAC – Michael Badgley 40-yard field goal, 3:22. Chargers 9-0. Drive: 9 plays, 37 yards, 5:29
- LAC – Michael Badgley 34-yard field goal, 0:00. Chargers 12-0. Drive: 12 plays, 58 yards, 1:48

Third quarter

- BAL – Justin Tucker 33-yard field goal, 8:30. Chargers 12-3. Drive: 4 plays, 6 yards, 1:56

Fourth quarter

- LAC – Melvin Gordon 1-yard run (Philip Rivers-Mike Williams pass), 14:44. Chargers 20-3. Drive: 10 plays, 60 yards, 4:38
- LAC – Michael Badgley 47-yard field goal, 9:09. Chargers 23-3. Drive: 7 plays, 16 yards, 4:00
- BAL – Michael Crabtree 31-yard pass from Lamar Jackson (Justin Tucker Kick), 6:33. Chargers 23-10. Drive: 8 plays, 75 yards, 2:36
- BAL – Michael Crabtree 7-yard pass from Lamar Jackson (Justin Tucker Kick), 1:59. Chargers 23-17. Drive: 12 plays, 80 yards, 2:48

Top passers

- LAC – Philip Rivers – 22/32, 160 yards
- BAL – Lamar Jackson – 14/29, 194 yards, 2 TD, INT

Top rushers

- LAC – Melvin Gordon – 17 rushes, 40 yards, TD
- BAL – Lamar Jackson – 9 rushes, 54 yards

Top receivers

- LAC – Mike Williams – 2 receptions, 42 yards
- BAL – Kenneth Dixon – 3 receptions, 53 yards

The Chargers recorded six sacks, jumped out to a 23–3 lead and halted a late Ravens rally, forcing Lamar Jackson to fumble on the final drive to earn a trip to New England.

On the Ravens' second possession of the game, Chargers defensive end Melvin Ingram forced a fumble from Kenneth Dixon that was recovered by safety Adrian Phillips, giving Los Angeles the ball on the Baltimore 14-yard line. Three plays later, Michael Badgley kicked a 21-yard field goal to give Los Angeles a 3–0 lead. Then the Chargers' defense forced a punt, which Desmond King returned 42 yards to the Ravens' 42-yard line, setting up a 53-yard Badgley field goal that increased their lead to 6–0. Early in the second quarter, Phillips intercepted a pass from Jackson to give the Chargers a first down on the Ravens' 44-yard line. From there, they drove 27 yards to go up 9–0 on Badgley's third field goal. Following another Ravens punt, Los Angeles drove 53 yards in 12 plays to score on Badgley's fourth field goal on the last play of the half, giving them a 12–0 lead.

King returned the second half kickoff 72 yards to the Ravens' 35-yard line, but this time the Chargers failed to score when Badgley's field goal attempt was blocked by Za'Darius Smith. After a Ravens punt, linebacker Patrick Onwuasor forced a fumble from Chargers tight end Virgil Green that was recovered by linebacker C. J. Mosley on the Los Angeles 21-yard line. This set up Justin Tucker's 33-yard field goal, cutting the score to 12–3 with 8:34 left in the third quarter. At the end of Los Angeles' next possession, the Ravens got another scoring opportunity when Javorius Allen blocked Donnie Jones's punt, resulting in Baltimore taking over on the Chargers' 40-yard line; they only managed to gain 4 yards with their next three plays and Tucker's 50-yard field goal attempt was wide right. Los Angeles then drove 60 yards in 10 plays, featuring a 28-yard completion from Philip Rivers to Mike Williams on the Ravens' 15-yard line. On the next play, Melvin Gordon ran the ball 14 yards to the 1-yard line. The Ravens managed to keep Los Angeles out of the end zone for the next three plays, but Gordon scored with a 4th down 1-yard touchdown run on the first play of the 4th quarter; Rivers completed a pass to Williams for a two-point conversion, giving the Chargers a 20–3 lead.

A sack by Ingram on the Ravens' ensuing drive forced them to punt from their 14-yard line and Sam Koch's 31-yard kick gave the Chargers good field position on the Ravens' 45-yard line. Los Angeles then drove 16 yards, including a 9-yard scramble by Rivers on 3rd-and-8, to score on Badgley's 5th field goal, from 47 yards, that gave them a 23–3 lead. Taking the ball back with 9:02 left, Baltimore drove 75 yards in eight plays, including Jackson's 29-yard completion to Willie Snead on 4th-and-11. On the next play, Jackson threw a 31-yard touchdown pass to receiver Michael Crabtree, making the score 23–10. The Chargers recovered Baltimore's ensuing onside kick attempt, but still had to punt after three plays. Baltimore went on to drive 85 yards in 12 plays, the longest a 39-yard completion from Jackson to Dixon. On the last play, Jackson threw a 6-yard touchdown pass to Crabtree, narrowing their gap to 23–17 with 2:06 left. Baltimore then forced a punt with 45 seconds to go, giving them one last chance to drive for a winning touchdown, but Chargers linebacker Uchenna Nwosu forced a fumble while sacking Jackson and Ingram recovered it to give Los Angeles the victory.

Rivers completed 22-of-32 passes for 160 yards and rushed for 15 yards. Ingram finished the game with seven tackles (two for a loss of yards), two sacks, a forced fumble and a fumble recovery. Phillips had five tackles (three solo), an interception and a fumble recovery. King returned a kickoff for 72 yards and had four punt returns for 46 yards. Jackson completed 14-of-29 passes for 194 yards, with two touchdowns and an interception; he was also Baltimore's leading rusher with 9 carries for 54 yards. Onwausor had seven tackles (six solo), a sack and a forced fumble.
