= Trotwood =

Trotwood may refer to:

== Fictional characters ==
- Betsey Trotwood, a fictional character from Charles Dickens' 1850 novel David Copperfield
- Officer Leslie Trotwood, a fictional character in the U.S. television series The Lizzie Borden Chronicles

== People ==
- John Trotwood Moore (1858–1929), American journalist, writer, and local historian
- Roger "Trotwood" Nowell, a member of the English rock band Skeletal Family

== Locations ==
- Trotwood, Ohio
  - Trotwood-Madison City School District
  - Dahio Trotwood Airport

== Ship ==
- Empire Trotwood, an Empire ship
