= DeShon Elliott =

American football player (born 1997)

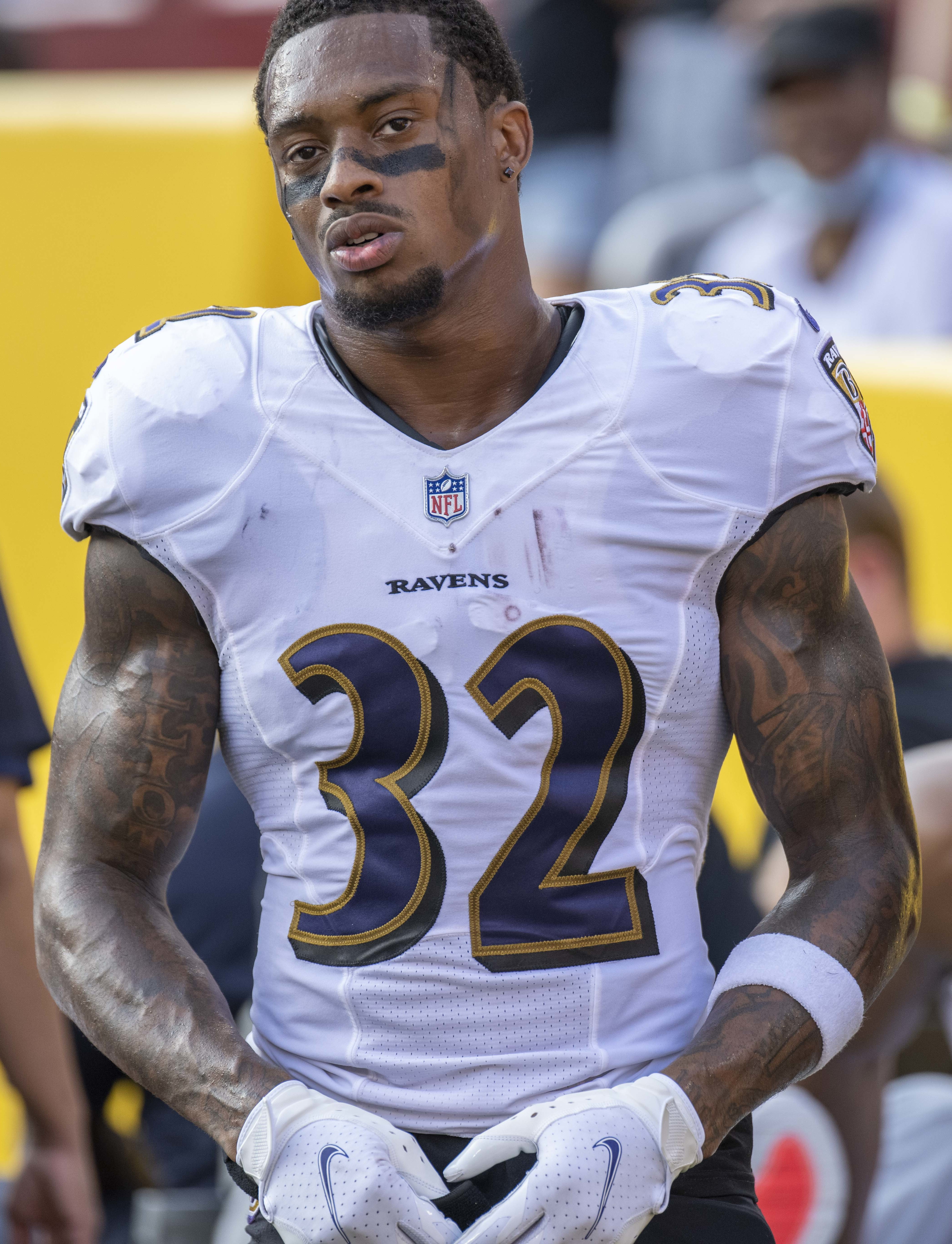
- Elliott with the Baltimore Ravens in 2021

No. 25 – Pittsburgh Steelers
- Position: Safety
- Roster status: Active

Personal information
- Born: April 21, 1997 (age 29); Dallas, Texas, U.S.
- Listed height: 6 ft 0 in (1.83 m)
- Listed weight: 210 lb (95 kg)

Career information
- High school: Rockwall-Heath (Heath, Texas)
- College: Texas (2015–2017)
- NFL draft: 2018: 6th round, 190th overall pick

Career history
- Baltimore Ravens (2018–2021); Detroit Lions (2022); Miami Dolphins (2023); Pittsburgh Steelers (2024–present)

Awards and highlights
- Unanimous All-American (2017); First-team All-Big 12 (2017)

Career NFL statistics as of Week 7, 2026
- Total tackles: 434
- Sacks: 4.5
- Pass deflections: 25
- Interceptions: 5
- Forced fumbles: 6
- Fumble recoveries: 5
- Stats at Pro Football Reference

DeShon Elliott (born April 21, 1997) is an American professional football safety for the Pittsburgh Steelers of the National Football League (NFL). He played college football for the Texas Longhorns and was selected by the Baltimore Ravens in the sixth round of the 2018 NFL draft.

== Early life ==
Elliott attended Rockwall-Heath High School in Heath, Texas, where he played high school football. He committed to the University of Texas to play college football.

== College career ==
As a freshman at Texas in 2015, Elliott played in seven games and recorded 13 tackles and two interceptions. As a sophomore he played in 12 games and made one start, recording 30 tackles, one interception and one sack. As a junior in 2017, Elliott was a finalist for the Jim Thorpe Award. In late November 2017, it was announced that Elliott would forgo his senior year at Texas in favor of the 2018 NFL draft, and that he would not play in the Longhorns' bowl game.

== Professional career ==
=== Pre-draft ===
He attended the NFL Scouting Combine and nearly completed all of the drills before injuring his hamstring. Pro Football Focus ranked Elliott as the eighth best safety in the draft. NFL draft analyst Mike Mayock ranked him as the sixth best safety in the draft. Prior to the NFL combine, the majority of NFL draft analysts projected him to be a second or third-round pick. Following the Combine, NFL draft analysts projections changed to the fourth or fifth round.

"Elliott has good size and is a physical defender who will need to play near the line of scrimmage to take advantage of his aggressiveness and minimize his athletic limitations. Scouts say he loves the game including the work that goes into it so he has a good shot of sticking on a roster as a backup strong safety with immediate coverage ability on kickoffs and punts. His draft stock will be tied heavily to his Combine workout."

— Lance Zierlein (NFL analyst)

External videos
- NFL Combine workout: DeShon Elliott
- DeShon Elliott's full 2018 NFL Combine

Pre-draft measurables
Height	Weight	Arm length	Hand span	Wingspan	40-yard dash	10-yard split	20-yard split	20-yard shuttle	Three-cone drill	Vertical jump	Broad jump	Bench press
6 ft 0 7/8 in (1.85 m)	210 lb (95 kg)	32 1/4 in (0.82 m)	10 1/2 in (0.27 m)	6 ft 5 3/4 in (1.97 m)	4.58 s	1.60 s	2.69 s	4.46 s	7.22 s	36.0 in (0.91 m)	10 ft 1 in (3.07 m)	15 reps
All values from NFL Combine

=== Baltimore Ravens ===
External videos
- Ravens draft DeShon Elliott 190th overall

The Baltimore Ravens selected Elliott in the sixth round (190th overall) of the 2018 NFL draft. He was the 17th safety drafted in 2018.

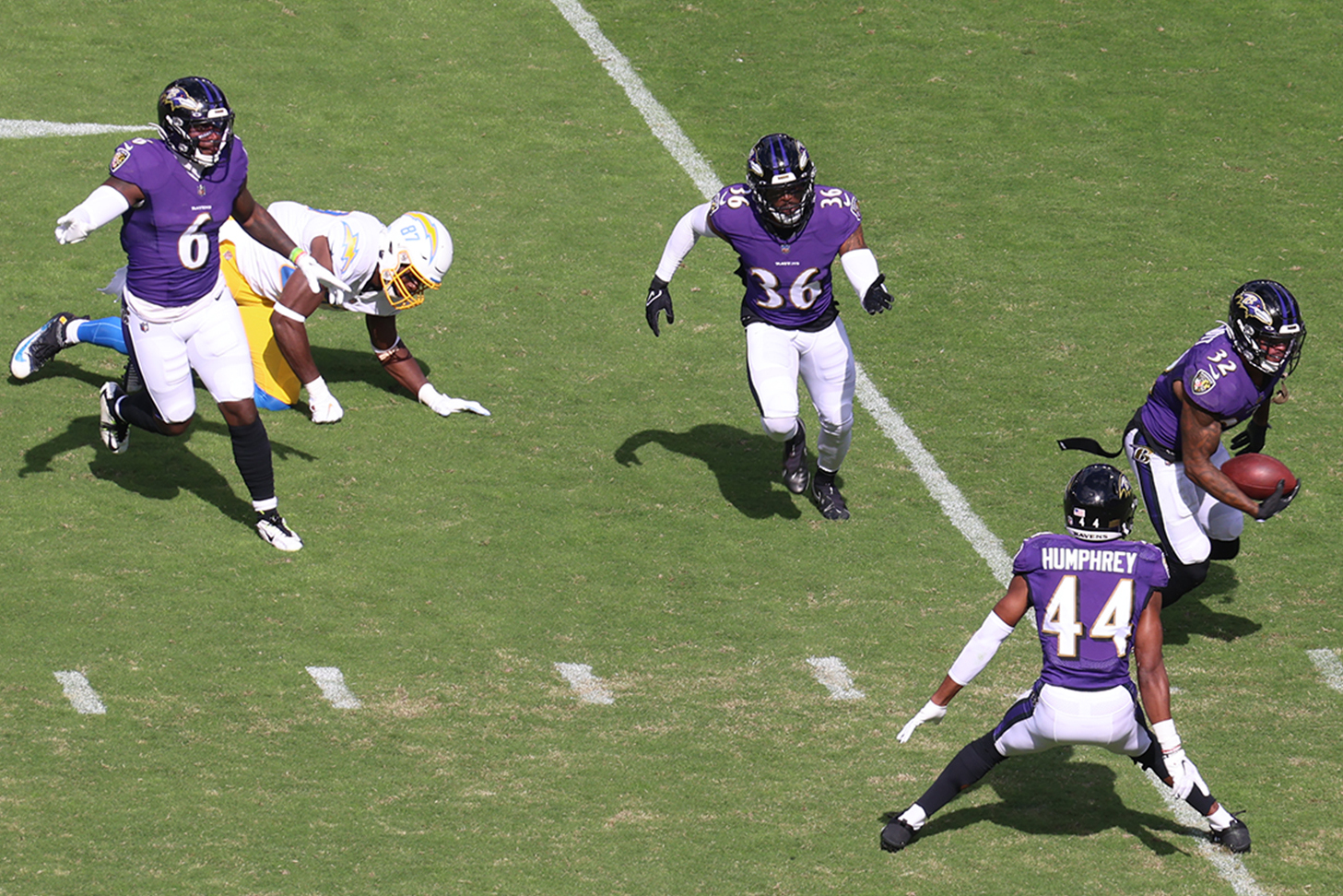
Elliott (#32) intercepts the ball against the Los Angeles Chargers in 2021.

"He’s a confident zone player. I don’t think he’s a great man-to-man matchup guy, but I think he can handle tight ends and running backs."

— Mike Mayock (NFL analyst)

On May 5, 2018, the Baltimore Ravens signed Elliott to a four–year, $2.61 million contract that includes an initial signing bonus of $157,795.

==== 2018 season ====
Throughout training camp, Elliott competed for a roster spot as a backup safety, against veterans Chuck Clark, Anthony Levine, and Kai Nacua. On August 25, 2018, Elliott sustained an arm injury and exited the Ravens' 27–10 victory against the Miami Dolphins. On August 31, 2018, the Baltimore Ravens officially placed Elliott on injured reserve with a fractured forearm. He subsequently missed the entire 2018 NFL season as the Baltimore Ravens finished first in the AFC North with a 10–6 record before exiting the playoffs after losing 17–26 to the Los Angeles Chargers in the AFC Wildcard Game.

==== 2019 season ====
Throughout training camp, Elliott competed for a roster spot as a backup safety against Anthony Levine and Brynden Trawick. Defensive coordinator Don Martindale named Earl Thomas and Tony Jefferson the starting safeties to begin the season with Elliott listed as the backup free safety behind Thomas. On September 8, 2019, Elliott made his long-awaited professional regular season debut in the Ravens' season-opener and made one solo tackle in their 59–10 victory at the Miami Dolphins. In Week 4, he collected a season-high three solo tackles during a 25–40 loss to the Cleveland Browns. In Week 6, he had one solo tackle before exiting the Ravens' 23–27 defeat over the Cincinnati Bengals due to an injury. On October 15, 2019, the Baltimore Ravens officially placed Elliott on injured reserve with a knee injury. He subsequently missed the remaining ten games (Weeks 7–17) of the 2019 NFL season. He finished his sophomore season appearing in only six games and being limited to six tackles. Pro Football Focus had an overall grade of 69.7 for Elliott in 2019.

==== 2020 season ====
He entered training camp in 2020 slated to be the primary backup safety behind Earl Thomas after Tony Jefferson was released. On August 23, 2020, the Baltimore Ravens, unexpectedly released Earl Thomas citing conduct detrimental to the team after he was sent home from practice following a physical altercation with Chuck Clark on August 21. Elliott subsequently became the definitive option as his replacement. Head coach John Harbaugh officially named Elliott the de facto starting free safety to begin the regular season, along with starting strong safety Chuck Clark.

On September 13, 2020, Elliott earned his first career start and recorded five combined tackles (two solo) in the Ravens' 38–6 defeat over the Cleveland Browns in their home-opener. The following week, he recorded four solo tackles and had his first career sack against Deshaun Watson for a four-yard loss in a 33–16 victory against the Houston Texans in Week 2. On November 3, 2020, the Baltimore Ravens placed him on the reserve/COVID-19 and activated him four days later. In Week 13, he racked up a season-high seven solo tackles as the Ravens routed the Dallas Cowboys 34–17. He finished the 2020 NFL season with 80 combined tackles (51 solo), four pass deflections, 2.5 sacks, and two forced fumbles while starting all 16 regular season games. He received an overall grade of 69.6 from Pro Football Focus.

The Baltimore Ravens earned a Wildcard berth after finishing second in the AFC North with an 11–5 record. On January 10, 2021, Elliott started in his first appearance in the postseason and made four combined tackles (three solo) as well as one pass deflection in a 20–13 victory at the Tennessee Titans in the AFC Wildcard Game. The following week, he had five combined tackles (four solo) as the Ravens were eliminated from the playoffs following a 3–17 loss at the Buffalo Bills in the AFC Divisional Round.

==== 2021 season ====
Head coach John Harbaugh retained Elliott and Chuck Clark as the starting safety duo in 2021. In Week 1, he collected a season-high seven combined tackles (four solo) in a 17–33 loss at the Las Vegas Raiders in their season-opener. He injured his quadriceps and was sidelined for two games (Weeks 4–5). On October 17, 2021, Elliott had his best performance during his stint with the Baltimore Ravens, recording three solo tackles, a pass deflection, one sack, and had his first career interception off a pass by Justin Herbert as the Ravens routed the Los Angeles Chargers 34–6. On November 8, 2021, Elliott was placed on injured reserve after suffering a season-ending biceps and pectoral injury late in the fourth quarter of a 34–31 overtime win over the Minnesota Vikings in Week 8. He ended his last season with the Baltimore Ravens with 21 combined tackles (19 solo), two pass deflections, one sack, and one interception in six games and six starts.

=== Detroit Lions ===
On April 14, 2022, the Detroit Lions signed Elliott to a one–year, $1.10 million contract that includes a signing bonus of $135,000. Elliott received limited interest in free agency due to his history with repeated injuries and the Baltimore Ravens chose not to extend an offer instead choosing to replace him at starting free safety with free agent Marcus Williams.

==== 2022 season ====
He entered training camp as the projected starting free safety, competing only with rookie Kerby Joseph, after defensive coordinator Aaron Glenn elected to transition former starting free safety Will Harris to nickelback. Head coach Dan Campbell named Elliott the starting free safety to begin 2022, alongside starting strong safety Tracy Walker.

On October 9, 2022, he collected a season-high 12 combined tackles (ten solo), made one pass deflection, and intercepted a pass attempt by Bailey Zappe intended for wide receiver Nelson Agholor in a 0–29 loss at the New England Patriots. He was sidelined during the Lions' Week 9 loss to the Miami Dolphins after injuring his finger. He missed another two games (Weeks 16–17) due to a shoulder injury. He finished the 2022 NFL season with a total of 96 combined tackles (73 solo), three pass deflections, one interception, one forced fumble, and a fumble recovery in 14 games and 13 starts. He received an overall grade of 66.5 from Pro Football Focus in 2022, which ranked 39th amongst 75 safeties.

=== Miami Dolphins ===
On March 15, 2023, the Miami Dolphins signed Elliott to a fully guaranteed one–year, $1.77 million contract that includes a signing bonus of $690,000.

==== 2023 season ====
Throughout training camp, Elliott competed against close friend and former college teammate Brandon Jones for the starting role at free safety. New defensive coordinator Vic Fangio named Elliott the starting free safety alongside Jevon Holland to start the regular season.

On September 10, 2023, Elliott started the Miami Dolphins' season-opener at the Los Angeles Chargers and collected a season-high 13 combined tackles (eight solo) in a 36–34 victory. In Week 3, he had five combined tackles (three solo) and a season-high two pass deflections as the Dolphins routed the Denver Broncos 70–20. He was inactive in the Dolphins' 20–48 loss at the Buffalo Bills in Week 4 after sustaining an ankle injury. He was sidelined during a 30–0 defeat over the New York Jets after suffering a concussion. On January 7, 2024, Elliott recorded ten combined tackles (six solo), deflected a pass, and intercepted a throw by Josh Allen intended for Gabriel Davis in a 21–14 loss to the Buffalo Bills in Week 18. He finished with 82 combined tackles (53 solo), seven pass deflections, one interception, and a fumble recovery in 15 games and 15 starts. He earned an overall grade of 72.6 from Pro Football Focus in 2023.

=== Pittsburgh Steelers ===
On March 14, 2024, the Pittsburgh Steelers signed Elliott to a two–year, $6.00 million contract that includes a signing bonus of $1.50 million.

==== 2024 season ====
He entered training camp slated as the de facto starting strong safety, replacing Damontae Kazee who became a backup free safety. Head coach Mike Tomlin named Elliott the starting strong safety to begin the season, alongside free safety Minkah Fitzpatrick.

On September 8, 2024, Elliott started in the Pittsburgh Steelers' season-opener at the Atlanta Falcons and recorded four combined tackles (one solo), a season-high two pass deflections, and intercepted a pass by Kirk Cousins intended for wide receiver Drake London during an 18–10 victory. In Week 14, he collected a season-high 14 combined tackles (nine solo) and deflected a pass in a 27–14 win over the Cleveland Browns. He injured his hamstring during the game and subsequently missed the next two games (Weeks 15–16). He finished the 2024 NFL season with a career-high total of 108 combined tackles (72 solo), six pass deflections, three fumble recoveries, two forced fumbles, and one interception in 15 games and 14 starts. He earned an overall grade of 71.1 from Pro Football Focus in 2024.

==== 2025 season ====
On June 16, 2025, Elliott signed a two-year, $12.5 million contract extension with Pittsburgh that includes $9.21 million guaranteed. After suffering a hyperextended knee in Week 8 against the Green Bay Packers, Elliott was placed on injured reserve on October 31.

==== 2026 season ====
Elliott began the 2026 season on injured reserve due to a hamstring injury. He was activated on October 24.

== NFL career statistics ==
Legend
**Bold**	Career high

=== Regular season ===
Year	Team	Games		Tackling				Fumbles			Interceptions					
Year	Team	GP	GS	Comb	Solo	Ast	Sck	FF	FR	Yds	Int	Yds	Avg	Lng	TD	PD
2018	BAL	0	0	Did not play due to injury												
2019	BAL	6	0	6	6	0	0.0	0	0	0	0	0	0.0	0	0	1
2020	BAL	16	16	80	51	29	**2.5**	**2**	0	0	0	0	0.0	0	0	4
2021	BAL	6	6	23	19	4	1.0	0	0	0	**1**	0	0.0	0	0	2
2022	DET	14	13	96	**73**	23	0.0	1	1	0	**1**	0	0.0	0	0	3
2023	MIA	15	15	82	53	29	0.0	0	1	0	**1**	0	0.0	0	0	**7**
2024	PIT	15	15	**108**	**72**	**36**	0.0	**2**	**3**	0	**1**	0	0.0	0	0	6
2025	PIT	5	5	38	20	18	1.0	1	0	0	**1**	−4	−4.0	−4	0	2
2026	PIT	1	0	1	1	0	0.0	0	0	0	0	0	0.0	0	0	0
Career		78	69	434	295	139	4.5	6	5	0	5	−4	−1.3	−4	0	25

=== Postseason ===
Year	Team	Games		Tackling				Fumbles			Interceptions					
Year	Team	GP	GS	Comb	Solo	Ast	Sck	FF	FR	Yds	Int	Yds	Avg	Lng	TD	PD
2018	BAL	0	0	Did not play due to injury												
2020	BAL	2	2	**9**	**7**	2	0.0	0	0	0	0	0	0.0	0	0	**1**
2023	MIA	1	1	**9**	3	**6**	0.0	0	0	0	0	0	0.0	0	0	0
2024	PIT	1	1	5	5	0	0.0	0	0	0	0	0	0.0	0	0	**1**
2025	PIT	0	0	Did not play due to injury												
Career		4	4	23	15	8	0.0	0	0	0	0	0	0.0	0	0	2
