= Dayton Airport =

Dayton Airport may refer to these airports serving Dayton, Ohio, United States:

- Dayton International Airport (FAA/IATA: DAY), also known as James M. Cox Dayton International Airport
- Dayton-Wright Brothers Airport (FAA/IATA: MGY)
- Dahio Trotwood Airport (FAA: I44), also known as Dayton-New Lebanon Airport
