= Mark Andrews (American football) =

American football player (born 1995)

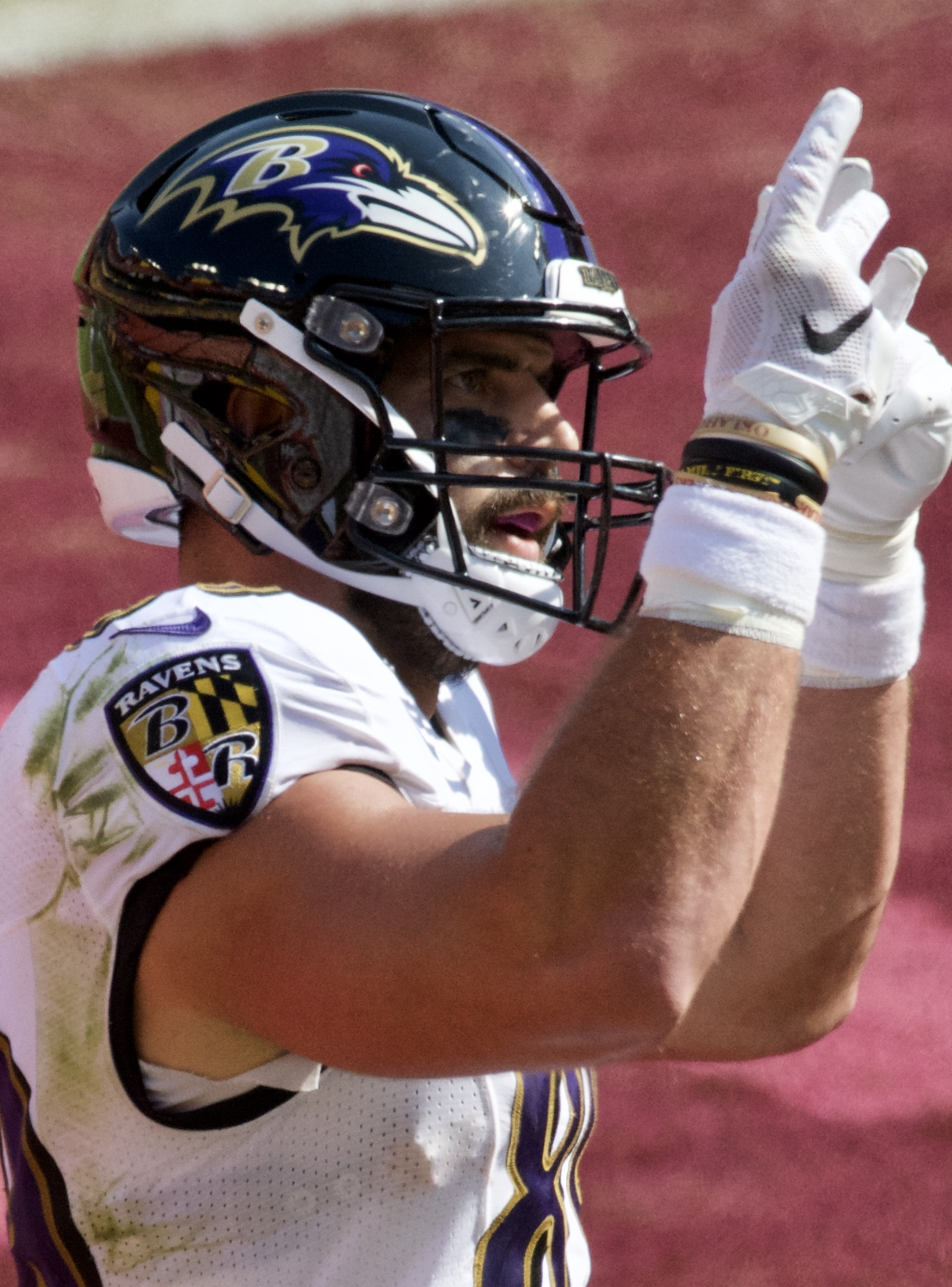
- Andrews with the Baltimore Ravens in 2020

No. 89 – Baltimore Ravens
- Position: Tight end
- Roster status: Active

Personal information
- Born: September 6, 1995 (age 31); Scottsdale, Arizona, U.S.
- Listed height: 6 ft 5 in (1.96 m)
- Listed weight: 250 lb (113 kg)

Career information
- High school: Desert Mountain (Scottsdale)
- College: Oklahoma (2014–2017)
- NFL draft: 2018: 3rd round, 86th overall pick

Career history
- Baltimore Ravens (2018–present)

Awards and highlights
- First-team All-Pro (2021); 3× Pro Bowl (2019, 2021, 2022); John Mackey Award (2017); Unanimous All-American (2017); Ozzie Newsome Award (2017); 2× First-team All-Big 12 (2016, 2017); Second-team All-Big 12 (2015)

Career NFL statistics as of Week 5, 2026
- Receptions: 506
- Receiving yards: 6,129
- Receiving touchdowns: 57
- Stats at Pro Football Reference

Mark Andrews (born September 6, 1995) is an American professional football tight end for the Baltimore Ravens of the National Football League (NFL). He played college football for the Oklahoma Sooners and was selected by the Ravens in the third round of the 2018 NFL draft. Andrews has been elected to the Pro Bowl three times and was named to the 2021 All-Pro Team after setting the Ravens' single-season record for receptions and receiving yards. As of the conclusion of the 2025 season, Andrews is the Ravens' franchise leader for most career receptions, receiving yards, and receiving touchdowns.

== Early life ==
Andrews was born in Scottsdale, Arizona, to Paul and Martha Andrews. His father is a urologist and his mother works in real estate. He has two brothers and a sister. Andrews was diagnosed with Type 1 Diabetes when he was nine years old, but has been unhindered by the disease throughout his career.

Andrews attended Desert Mountain High School in Scottsdale, Arizona. He played wide receiver in high school and had 58 receptions for 1,058 yards and 10 touchdowns as a sophomore, 81 receptions for 1,494 yards and 21 touchdowns as a junior and 68 receptions for 1,122 yards and 17 touchdowns as a senior. His quarterback in high school was Kyle Allen. He held the Arizona high school record for career receptions, before Kade Warner, the son of Kurt Warner, broke his record. Andrews committed to the University of Oklahoma to play college football.

== College career ==
Andrews switched from wide receiver to tight end at Oklahoma. After redshirting his first year in 2014, he played in all 13 games with one start in 2015 and had 19 receptions for 318 yards and seven touchdowns. In 2016, Andrews started 11 of 13 games, recording 31 receptions for 489 yards and seven touchdowns. He was the recipient of the 2017 John Mackey Award. In early January 2018, it was announced that Andrews would forgo his senior year at Oklahoma in favor of the 2018 NFL draft. Andrews finished his three years at Oklahoma with the sixth most touchdown receptions (22) by any receiver and had the most receiving yards (1,765) by a tight end.

== Professional career ==
=== Pre-draft ===
On January 4, 2018, Andrews announced his decision to forgo his remaining eligibility and enter the 2018 NFL Draft. Andrews attended the NFL Scouting Combine in Indianapolis and completed all of the combine and positional drills. His overall performance was described as solid by scouts and analysts. On March 14, 2018, Andrews participated at Oklahoma's pro day, but chose to stand on his combine numbers and only performed positional drills. At the conclusion of the pre-draft process, Andrews was projected to be a second round pick by NFL draft experts and scouts. He was ranked as the fourth best tight end prospect in the draft by DraftScout.com, Scouts Inc., NFL analyst Mike Mayock, and Sports Illustrated.

External videos
- NFL Draft Profile: Mark Andrews
- Mark Andrews' 40-yard dash

Pre-draft measurables
Height	Weight	Arm length	Hand span	Wingspan	40-yard dash	10-yard split	20-yard split	20-yard shuttle	Three-cone drill	Vertical jump	Broad jump	Bench press
6 ft 5 1/8 in (1.96 m)	256 lb (116 kg)	32 1/2 in (0.83 m)	9 1/2 in (0.24 m)	6 ft 5 in (1.96 m)	4.67 s	1.66 s	2.75 s	4.38 s	7.34 s	31.0 in (0.79 m)	9 ft 5 in (2.87 m)	17 reps
All values from NFL Combine

External videos
- Ravens draft Mark Andrews 86th overall

=== 2018 ===
The Baltimore Ravens selected Andrews in the third round (86th overall) of the 2018 NFL draft. Andrews was the fourth tight end drafted in 2018 and was the second tight end drafted by the Ravens, after Hayden Hurst (25th overall). On May 16, 2018, the Baltimore Ravens signed Andrews to a four-year, $3.45 million contract that includes a signing bonus of $836,660.

Throughout training camp, Andrews competed to be a starting tight end against Hayden Hurst, Nick Boyle, and Maxx Williams. Head coach John Harbaugh named Andrews the fourth tight end to start the regular season, behind Hurst, Williams, and Boyle.

In the season opener against the Buffalo Bills, Andrews made his NFL debut and had three receptions for 31 yards in the 47–3 victory. On September 13, Andrews scored his first-career touchdown in the 23–34 loss to the Cincinnati Bengals.

Andrews closed out the 2018 regular season with 34 receptions for 552 yards and three touchdowns. He was responsible for two of the Ravens longest passing plays that season. The first was a 74-yard catch-and-run against the Oakland Raiders on November 25 and the second was a 68-yard touchdown against the Los Angeles Chargers on December 22. He led all rookie tight ends in receiving yards and finished third in receptions.

=== 2019 ===
In Week 1 against the Miami Dolphins, Andrews had eight catches for 108 yards and one touchdown as the Ravens won 59–10. In Week 2 against the Arizona Cardinals, Andrews caught eight passes for 112 yards and one touchdown as the Ravens won 23–17. In Week 16 against the Cleveland Browns, Andrews caught six passes for 93 yards and two touchdowns during the 31–15 win. Overall, Andrews finished the 2019 season with 64 receptions for 852 receiving yards and ten receiving touchdowns. His ten receiving touchdowns led the league among tight ends and tied with Cooper Kupp for second in the league among all positions. He was named to his first Pro Bowl for his efforts in the 2019 season.

=== 2020 ===
Andrews started the 2020 season off with five catches for 58 yards and two receiving touchdowns in the Ravens' 38–6 victory over the Browns. In Week 3 against the Kansas City Chiefs, Andrews caught three of his eight targets and dropped a potential touchdown pass in the end zone during the 20–34 loss. Andrews rebounded in the following week’s game against the Washington Football Team, catching three passes for 57 yards and two touchdowns during the 31–17 win. In Week 11 against the Tennessee Titans, Andrews recorded five catches for 96 yards and a touchdown during the 24–30 overtime loss. He was placed on the reserve/COVID-19 list by the team on November 30, 2020, and activated on December 9. Andrews finished the 2020 season with 58 receptions for 701 receiving yards and seven receiving touchdowns.

=== 2021 ===
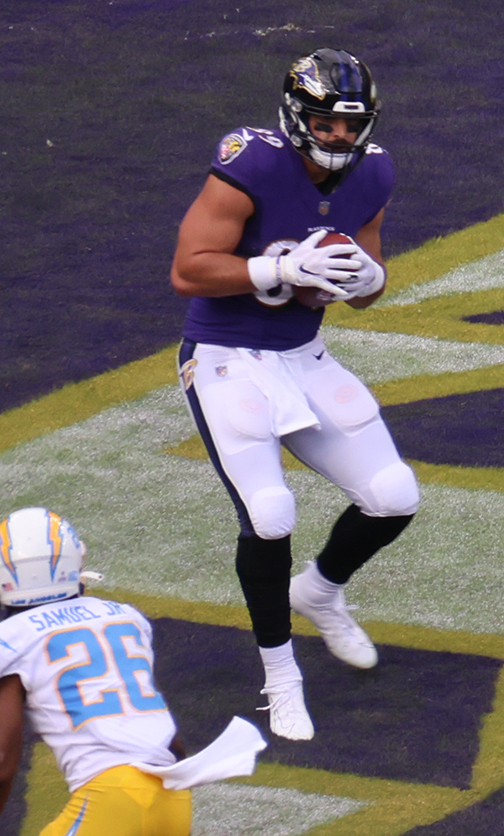
Andrews scores a touchdown against the Los Angeles Chargers in 2021.

On September 6, 2021, the Ravens signed Andrews to a four-year, $56 million extension including $37.6 million guaranteed. In Week 3 against the Detroit Lions, Andrews had five receptions for 109 yards in a 19–17 comeback win. It was Andrews' first 100-yard game since Week 2 of the 2019 season. In Week 5 against the Indianapolis Colts, Andrews caught 11 of 13 targets for 147 yards and two touchdowns as well as two two-point conversion receptions (all career-highs), helping the Ravens to rally and win in overtime 31–25. Later that season, Andrews recorded three straight 100-yard receiving games between Weeks 14–16. In Week 14, Andrews recorded 11 receptions (tying his career-high from earlier in the season) for 115 yards and a touchdown in a 22–24 loss to the Browns. The next week, he had 10 receptions for 136 yards and two touchdowns in a 30–31 loss to the Green Bay Packers. In Week 16, he had eight receptions for 125 yards and a touchdown in 21–41 loss to the Bengals.

Andrews would go on to finish the season setting a career high in receptions (107) and receiving yards (1,361) to go along with 9 receiving touchdowns in 17 games played. At the end of the season, Andrews was voted into his second Pro Bowl and was named First-team All-Pro by the Associated Press. He was ranked 32nd by his fellow players on the NFL Top 100 Players of 2022.

=== 2022 ===
Andrews entered the 2022 season as a full-time starter for the first time in his career. In a Week 2 38–42 loss to the Dolphins, he had his first 100-yard receiving game of the season with nine receptions for 104 yards and a touchdown along with a three yard rush. The next week against the New England Patriots, he had eight receptions for 89 yards and two touchdowns in the 37–26 win. Andrews recorded his second 100-yard performance in a Week 6 20–24 loss to the New York Giants, finishing the game with seven receptions for 106 yards and a touchdown. He finished the 2022 season with 73 receptions for 847 receiving yards and five receiving touchdowns in 15 games and starts. He earned a third Pro Bowl nomination. He was ranked 80th by his fellow players on the NFL Top 100 Players of 2023.

=== 2023 ===
Andrews entered the season as inactive with a quad injury, sitting out Week 1 against the Houston Texans. In Week 4, against the Browns, he had two receiving touchdowns. In Week 7, he had another game with two receiving touchdowns, this time against the Detroit Lions. On November 16, during a Week 11 game against the Bengals, Andrews injured his ankle during the first quarter after being tackled by Bengals' linebacker Logan Wilson. Andrews was brought back to the locker room for further evaluation. After the game, it was announced he had suffered a cracked fibula and an ankle ligament injury, sidelining him for the rest of the regular season. Andrews underwent ankle surgery on November 21, and was placed on the injured reserve on November 25. He finished the 2023 season with 45 receptions for 544 yards and six touchdowns. Andrews was activated off of injured reserve on January 26, 2024, ahead of the AFC Championship game against the Kansas City Chiefs.

=== 2024 ===
In Week 6 against the Washington Commanders, Andrews caught a 13 yard touchdown pass and tied Todd Heap for the most receiving touchdowns in Ravens franchise history. The Ravens would go on to win that game 30–23. The following week against the Tampa Bay Buccaneers, Andrews caught two receiving touchdowns and would surpass Heap as the Ravens all time leader in receiving touchdowns as the Ravens would win that game 41–31. On December 15 against the New York Giants, Andrews, after catching a 13-yard pass from Lamar Jackson, scored his 48th touchdown of his career, surpassing Jamal Lewis' previous franchise record of 47 career touchdowns and becoming the all-time Ravens franchise touchdown leader. Andrews finished the 2024 season with 55 receptions for 673 yards and a career-high 11 touchdowns. In the fourth quarter of the Divisional Round against the Buffalo Bills, Andrews lost his first fumble since the 2019 season and dropped the potential game-tying two-point conversion as the Ravens lost 27–25.

=== 2025 ===
On December 3, 2025, Andrews agreed to a three-year, $39.3 million contract extension with the Ravens. Andrews finished the 2025 season with 48 receptions for 422 yards and five receiving touchdowns to go with a rushing touchdown.

== Career statistics ==
Legend
**Bold**	Career high

=== NFL ===
==== Regular season ====
Year	Team	Games		Receiving							Rushing					Fumbles	
Year	Team	GP	GS	Tgt	Rec	Yds	Avg	Lng	TD	FD	Att	Yds	Avg	Lng	TD	Fum	Lost
2018	BAL	16	3	50	34	552	**16.2**	**74**	3	28	0	–	—	–	–	0	0
2019	BAL	15	4	98	64	852	13.3	51	10	44	0	–	—	–	–	**2**	**1**
2020	BAL	14	2	88	58	701	12.1	39	7	37	0	–	—	–	–	**2**	0
2021	BAL	17	9	**153**	**107**	**1,361**	12.7	43	9	**75**	1	0	0.0	0	0	1	0
2022	BAL	15	15	113	73	847	11.6	36	5	51	3	8	2.7	4	0	1	0
2023	BAL	10	9	61	45	544	12.1	38	6	27	1	0	0.0	0	0	1	0
2024	BAL	17	13	69	55	673	12.2	67	**11**	44	4	5	1.3	2	0	0	0
2025	BAL	17	11	70	48	422	8.8	27	5	24	**10**	**48**	**4.8**	**35**	**1**	1	0
2026	BAL	5	4	30	22	177	8.5	17	1	11	0	0	0.0	0	0	1	1
Career		126	70	732	506	6,129	12.8	74	57	341	19	61	3.2	35	1	9	2

==== Postseason ====
Year	Team	Games		Receiving							Rushing					Fumbles	
Year	Team	GP	GS	Tgt	Rec	Yds	Avg	Lng	TD	FD	Att	Yds	Avg	Lng	TD	Fum	Lost
2018	BAL	1	0	7	3	31	10.3	13	0	1	0	0	—	0	0	0	0
2019	BAL	1	0	7	4	39	9.8	16	0	3	0	0	—	0	0	0	0
2020	BAL	2	1	**17**	**8**	69	8.6	17	0	3	0	0	—	0	0	0	0
2022	BAL	1	1	10	5	73	**14.6**	**29**	0	3	1	0	0.0	0	0	0	0
2023	BAL	1	0	2	2	15	7.5	9	0	0	0	0	—	0	0	0	0
2024	BAL	2	2	10	7	**88**	12.6	20	0	**5**	**4**	**8**	**2.0**	**3**	0	**1**	**1**
Career		8	4	53	29	315	10.9	29	0	15	5	8	1.6	3	0	1	1

=== College ===
Season	Team	Games	Receiving			
Season	Team	GP	Rec	Yards	Avg	TD
2014	Oklahoma	0	Redshirt			
2015	Oklahoma	9	19	318	**16.7**	7
2016	Oklahoma	12	31	489	15.8	7
2017	Oklahoma	14	**62**	**958**	15.5	**8**
Career		35	112	1,765	15.8	22

== Career highlights ==
=== Awards and honors ===
NFL

- First-team All-Pro (2021)
- 3× Pro Bowl (2019, 2021, 2022)
- 3× NFL Top 100 — 32nd (2022), 80th (2023), 90th (2024)

College

- John Mackey Award (2017)
- Unanimous All-American (2017)
- Ozzie Newsome Award (2017)
- 2× First-team All-Big 12 (2016, 2017)
- Second-team All-Big 12 (2015)

=== Ravens franchise records ===
- Most touchdowns: 56 (as of Week 11, 2025 NFL season)
- Most receiving yards: 5,806 (2025)
- Most receptions: 472 (2025)
- Most single-season receiving yards: 1,361 (2021)
- Most receptions in a single season: 107 (2021)
- Most touchdown receptions by a tight end in a season: 11 (2024)
- Most receiving yards by a tight end in rookie season: 552 (2018)
- Longest regular season reception by a tight end: 74 yds (2018)

== Personal life ==
Because of his Type 1 diabetes, Andrews wears an insulin pump, except when he plays football. He serves as a spokesperson for those with diabetes and speaks with young people about its effects and ways to live with diabetes. He is a native to Scottsdale, Arizona.

In November 2025, Andrews became engaged to his girlfriend, Elena Yates.
