= Dayton/Phillipsburg Airport =

Public use airport in Phillipsburg, Ohio

- IATA: none; ICAO: none; FAA LID: 3I7

Summary
- Airport type: Public
- Owner: DJTM Holdings
- Location: Phillipsburg, Ohio
- Time zone: UTC−05:00 (-5)
  - Summer (DST): UTC−04:00 (-4)
- Elevation AMSL: 1,028 ft (313 m)
- Coordinates: 39°54′47″N 084°24′01″W

Map
- Location of airport in Ohio 3I7 (the United States)

Runways
Direction	Length		Surface
Direction	ft	m	Surface
3/21	3,000	914	Asphalt

Statistics (2022)
- Aircraft Operations: 14,600
- Based aircraft: 60
- Sources: Federal Aviation Administration, AirNav, SkyVector

Dayton/Phillipsburg Airport (FAA LID: 3I7) is a public use airport located 13 nautical miles northwest of Dayton, Ohio.

== History ==
John and Geneva Myers founded the airport in 1959.

Gene Miller moved his flying service from Dahio Airport in August 1969 to become airport operator.

A hangar being built by the Civil Air Patrol was destroyed by a windstorm in January 1971. In 1973, an 18-year old secretary and pilot at the airport was elected to Phillipsburg city council. As a result of concerns of local residents, the original runway was closed and a new one was opened in June 1974. One year later it was being extended to 2,750 feet (840 m).

The airport was purchased by Gene and Jayne Miller in 1990. By late February 1994, the airport had 60 hangars, runway lighting and an instrument approach.

When the airport was sold in 2012, an adjacent plant nursery sued to close it so that it could acquire the land. However, it was purchased by Jaime Steel-Potter and Danny Potter, who kept it open.

== Facilities and aircraft ==
=== Facilities ===
Piqua Airport has one runway, designated 3/21 with an asphalt surface measuring 3,000 by 40 feet (914 x 12 m).

The airport has a fixed-base operator that offers limited services. Parking includes hangars and tie-downs for visiting aircraft. Fuel service offers 100LL and Jet-A.

=== Aircraft ===
Based on the 12-month period ending 21 June 2022, the airport had 14,600 aircraft operations, an average of 40 per day. All were general aviation.

For the same time period, 60 aircraft are based on the field: 50 single-engine airplanes and 10 ultralights.

== Accidents and incidents ==
- On 23 March 1969, a Piper PA-22 Tri-Pacer crashed while taking off from the airport, destroying the airplane and injuring the pilot and two passengers.
- On 19 September 1971, a Stinson Model 10A crashed and caught fire while taking off from the airport, injuring the pilot and two passengers. The parents of one of the passengers later sued the pilot.

== See also ==
- List of airports in Ohio
