= Trotwood-Madison High School =

Location
- 4440 N. Union Rd. Trotwood, Ohio 45426; United States; 39°48′35″N 84°18′37″W

Information
- Type: Public secondary
- Principal: Michael McCray
- Teaching staff: 42.00 (FTE)
- Grades: 9–12
- Enrollment: 829 (2023–2024)
- Student to teacher ratio: 19.74
- Colors: Red & white
- Mascot: Ram
- Website: ths.trotwood.k12.oh.us

Trotwood-Madison High School is part of Trotwood-Madison City School District located in Trotwood, Ohio. The school mascot is the Ram.

== Athletics ==
=== State championships ===
- Boys basketball – 2019, 2026
- Boys football – 2011, 2017, 2019
- Girls, track and field – 1983, 1984, 1995

== Notable alumni ==
- Bam Bradley, professional football player, Baltimore Ravens
- Chunky Clements, former professional football player, Houston Texans
- John "J.D." Dorian, fictional medical doctor, Scrubs
- Mark Henn, retired animator and film director, Walt Disney Animation Studios
- Andre Hutson, former professional basketball player
- Maurice Douglass, former head football coach and former NFL player
- Nicholas Grigsby, former NFL football player
- LaVonna Martin, Olympic silver medalist and Pan-American gold medalist
- Don Martindale, defensive coordination, Baltimore Ravens
- Mike McCray, former collegiate football player, University of Michigan
- Roland McGhee, former international track & field athlete
- Roy Roundtree, former collegiate football player, University of Michigan
- Michael Shaw, former collegiate football player, University of Michigan
- Vincent M. Ward, actor
- Chris Wright, professional basketball player
