= Chunky Clements =

American football player (born 1994)

No. 96
- Position: Defensive tackle

Personal information
- Born: December 3, 1994 (age 31); Dayton, Ohio
- Listed height: 6 ft 2 in (1.88 m)
- Listed weight: 299 lb (136 kg)

Career information
- High school: Trotwood-Madison (Trotwood, Ohio)
- College: Illinois
- NFL draft: 2017: undrafted

Career history
- Minnesota Vikings (2017)*; Houston Texans (2017); Los Angeles Rams (2018)*; Arizona Hotshots (2019); Indianapolis Colts (2019)*
- * Offseason or practice squad member only
- Stats at Pro Football Reference

Jarrod Patrick "Chunky" Clements (born December 3, 1994) is an American former football defensive tackle. He played college football at Illinois.

== Professional career ==
=== Minnesota Vikings ===
Clements signed with the Minnesota Vikings as an undrafted free agent on July 21, 2017. He was waived by the Vikings on September 2, 2017.

=== Houston Texans ===
On October 25, 2017, Clements was signed to the Houston Texans' practice squad. He was promoted to the active roster on November 8, 2017. He was waived on December 15, 2017, and re-signed to the practice squad the next day. He was promoted back to the active roster on December 19, 2017.

On March 21, 2018, Clements was waived by the Texans.

=== Los Angeles Rams ===
On May 21, 2018, Clements signed with the Los Angeles Rams. He was waived on August 31, 2018.

=== Arizona Hotshots ===
On January 8, 2019, Clements was signed by the Arizona Hotshots of the Alliance of American Football. He was waived after the first regular season game on February 12, 2019.

=== Indianapolis Colts ===
On May 28, 2019, Clements signed with the Indianapolis Colts. On June 13, 2019, the Colts cut Clements.
