= Chuck Clark =

American football player (born 1995)

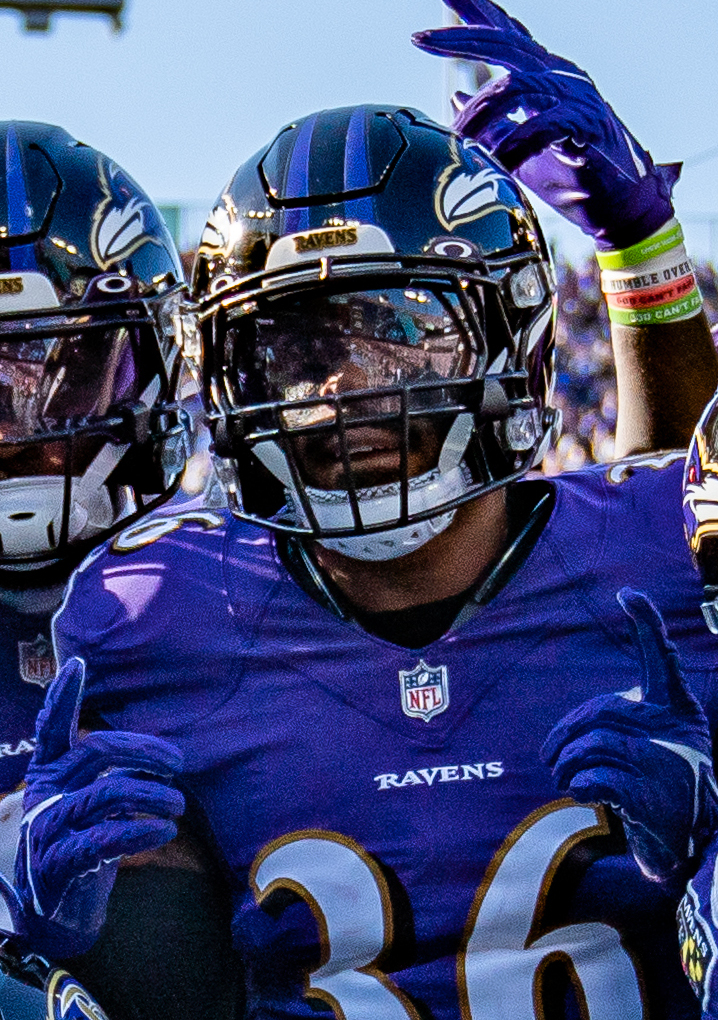
- Clark with the Baltimore Ravens in 2021

No. 36 – Detroit Lions
- Position: Safety
- Roster status: Active

Personal information
- Born: April 19, 1995 (age 31); Philadelphia, Pennsylvania, U.S.
- Listed height: 6 ft 0 in (1.83 m)
- Listed weight: 205 lb (93 kg)

Career information
- High school: King's Fork (Suffolk, Virginia)
- College: Virginia Tech (2013–2016)
- NFL draft: 2017: 6th round, 186th overall pick

Career history
- Baltimore Ravens (2017–2022); New York Jets (2023–2024); Pittsburgh Steelers (2025); Detroit Lions (2026–present)

Career NFL statistics as of 2025
- Total tackles: 504
- Sacks: 4.5
- Forced fumbles: 7
- Fumble recoveries: 5
- Pass deflections: 37
- Interceptions: 5
- Defensive touchdowns: 2
- Stats at Pro Football Reference

Charles Edward Clark Jr. (born April 19, 1995) is an American professional football safety for the Detroit Lions of the National Football League (NFL). He played college football for the Virginia Tech Hokies. Clark was selected by the Baltimore Ravens in the sixth round of the 2017 NFL draft. Clark has also played for the New York Jets and Pittsburgh Steelers.

== Early life ==
Clark went to King's Fork High School in Suffolk, Virginia. He played American football, basketball, and ran track. At his position, he was rated as the no. 68 safety in the country, the no. 145 player in his region, and the 34th-ranked player in the state by ESPN.

== College career ==
While at Virginia Tech, Clark started in 40 of 52 games and had a total of 292 tackles.

== Professional career ==
=== Pre-draft ===
Clark attended the NFL Scouting Combine and was listed as a cornerback. On March 15, 2017, Clark attended Virginia Tech’s Pro Day and chose to run the 40-yard dash (4.56s), 20-yard dash (2.65s), 10-yard dash (1.59s), and vertical jump (33 1/2 in). Unfortunately, Clark was unable to improve upon his combine numbers. At the conclusion of the pre-draft process, Clark was projected to be a sixth to seventh round pick or to go undrafted by NFL draft experts and scouts. He was ranked as the 11th best free safety prospect available in the draft by DraftScout.com.

"A team captain and three-year starter at Virginia Tech, Clarke [sic] is an interchangeable safety and reliable run-defender with average size and above-average length. He also has the athletic ability and range to hold up in coverage, but he's not a playmaker yet."

— Steve Muench (ESPN)

Pre-draft measurables
Height	Weight	Arm length	Hand span	Wingspan	40-yard dash	10-yard split	20-yard split	20-yard shuttle	Three-cone drill	Vertical jump	Broad jump	Bench press
6 ft 0 in (1.83 m)	208 lb (94 kg)	32 1/4 in (0.82 m)	9 in (0.23 m)	6 ft 5 1/8 in (1.96 m)	4.54 s	1.51 s	2.63 s	4.07 s	6.85 s	34 in (0.86 m)	10 ft 2 in (3.10 m)	16 reps
All values from NFL Combine

=== Baltimore Ravens ===
The Baltimore Ravens selected Clark in the sixth round (186th overall) of the 2017 NFL draft. Clark was the 17th safety drafted in 2017 and was the first of four players drafted from Virginia Tech.

==== 2017 ====
On May 5, 2017, the Baltimore Ravens signed Clark to a four–year, $2.57 million contract that included an initial signing bonus of $174,807. Throughout training camp, Clark competed for a roster spot as a backup safety and special teams player. Head coach John Harbaugh named Clark the third free safety on the depth chart, behind veterans Eric Weddle and Lardarius Webb, to start the regular season.

On September 17, 2017, Clark made his professional regular season debut in the Ravens’ season-opening 20–0 victory at the Cincinnati Bengals, but did not register a statistic. The following week, Clark made his first tackle of his career during a 24–10 win against the Cleveland Browns in Week 2. Clark made his tackle on Jabrill Peppers during an 18-yard kick return by Peppers in the second quarter. Clark was inactive as a healthy scratch for the Baltimore Ravens’ 23–20 loss at the Tennessee Titans in Week 9. On December 31, 2017, Clark collected a season-high three solo tackles during a 31–27 loss against the Cincinnati Bengals in Week 17. The following day, it was announced that defensive coordinator Dean Pees had officially announced his retirement. He finished his rookie season with a total of 13 combined tackles (12 solo) and two pass deflections in 15 games and zero starts.

==== 2018 ====
He entered training camp as a backup safety with Eric Weddle and Tony Jefferson established as the starters. Head coach John Harbaugh named Clark the primary backup free safety, behind Eric Weddle, to begin the regular season.

On December 2, 2018, Clark earned his first career start after Tony Jefferson sustained an ankle injury the previous week and remained inactive for two consecutive games. Clark finished the Ravens’ 26–16 victory at the Atlanta Falcons with four combined tackles (three solo). In Week 14, Clark recorded four combined tackles (three solo), deflected a pass, and made his first career interception during a 27–24 loss at the Kansas City Chiefs. Clark intercepted a pass by quarterback Patrick Mahomes, that was intended for wide receiver Tyreek Hill, and returned it for a five-yard gain in the second quarter. He finished the season with 21 combined tackles (16 solo), one pass deflection, and an interception in 16 games and two starts.

The Ravens finished the 2018 NFL season atop the AFC North with a 10–6 record, clinching a playoff berth. On January 6, 2019, Clark appeared in his first career playoff game as the Ravens lost 23–17 to the Los Angeles Chargers in the AFC Wild Card Round.

==== 2019 ====
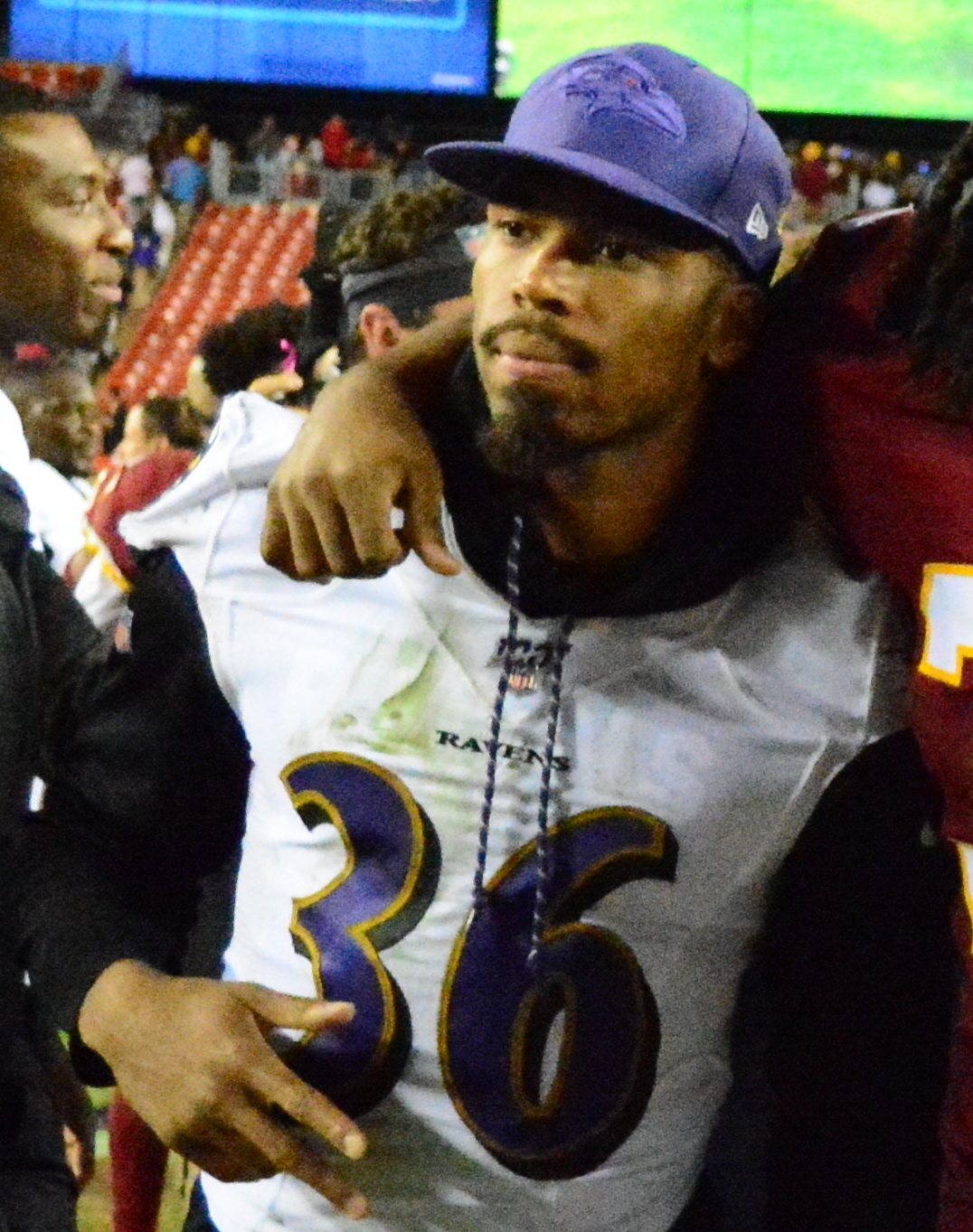
Clark in 2019.

Clark retained his role as the backup free safety, behind Tony Jefferson, in his second season under defensive coordinator Don Martindale. In Week 6, Clark became the starting free safety for the remainder of the season after Tony Jefferson sustained a torn ACL during a 26–23 win at the Pittsburgh Steelers the previous week.

In week 13 of the 2019 season against the San Francisco 49ers, Clark made a team high 7 tackles and recorded a strip sack on Jimmy Garoppolo that was recovered by teammate Brandon Williams in the 20–17 win. In week 15 of the 2019 season, Clark recorded an interception off Sam Darnold in a 42–21 win over the New York Jets. During the 2019 season, Clark took over the role of communicator of the defense when he was selected to be the lone player with the headset in his helmet to relay play calls to his teammates.

==== 2020 ====
On February 10, 2020, the Baltimore Ravens signed Clark to a three–year, $15.30 million contract extension that includes $10 million guaranteed and an initial signing bonus of $5.50 million.

In Week 5 against the Bengals, Clark recorded his first sack of the season on Joe Burrow during the 27–3 win. In Week 9 against the Indianapolis Colts, Clark recovered a fumble forced by teammate Marcus Peters on running back Jonathan Taylor and returned it for a 65-yard touchdown during the 24–10 win.

In Week 17 against the Cincinnati Bengals, Clark recorded his first interception of the season off a pass thrown by Brandon Allen during the 38–3 win.

==== 2021 ====
In Week 17 against the Los Angeles Rams, he recorded interceptions off Matthew Stafford on consecutive drives, including a Pick 6 on the first one, but the Ravens would lose 19–20. He also had seven tackles and three pass breakups during the game.

==== 2022 ====
Clark set career-highs in tackles in 2022, finishing second on the team in both total and solo tackles with 101 and 61 respectively. He also had the most assisted tackles with 40.

=== New York Jets ===
==== 2023 ====
Clark was traded to the New York Jets in exchange for a 2024 seventh-round pick on March 15, 2023. On June 22, it was announced that Clark would miss the 2023 season after suffering a torn ACL during OTAs. He was placed on injured reserve on July 19.

==== 2024 ====
On March 10, 2024, the New York Jets signed Clark to a one–year, $2.00 million contract that includes an initial signing bonus of $705,000.

He was named the Jets starting strong safety to begin the season. Clark started 12 games for the Jets, recording 2 pass deflections, 1 forced fumble, 1 fumble recovery, 1.0 sack, and 69 combined tackles. On December 31, Clark was placed on injured reserve with a torn pectoral muscle, ending his season.

=== Pittsburgh Steelers ===
On July 25, 2025, Clark signed with the Pittsburgh Steelers. Clark made 15 appearances (including five starts) for the Steelers during the regular season, recording three pass deflections, one forced fumble, and 51 combined tackles.

=== Detroit Lions ===
On March 31, 2026, Clark signed with the Detroit Lions.

== NFL career statistics ==
Legend
**Bold**	Career high

=== Regular season ===
Year	Team	Games		Tackles					Interceptions						Fumbles				
Year	Team	GP	GS	Comb	Solo	Ast	Sck	TFL	PD	Int	Yds	Avg	Lng	TD	FF	Fum	FR	Yds	TD
2017	BAL	15	0	13	12	1	0.0	0	2	0	–	–	–	–	0	0	0	0	–
2018	BAL	16	2	21	16	5	0.0	0	1	1	5	5.0	5	0	0	0	0	0	–
2019	BAL	16	12	73	45	28	1.0	2	9	1	12	**12.0**	12	0	**2**	0	0	0	–
2020	BAL	16	16	96	57	39	**1.5**	**3**	4	1	0	0.0	0	0	**2**	**1**	**3**	**66**	**1**
2021	BAL	16	16	80	49	31	1.0	**3**	**12**	**2**	**17**	8.5	**17**	**1**	0	0	0	0	–
2022	BAL	**17**	**17**	**101**	**61**	**40**	0.0	0	4	0	–	–	–	–	1	0	1	-5	0
2023	NYJ	0	0	Did not play due to injury															
2024	NYJ	12	12	69	38	31	1.0	1	2	0	–	–	–	–	1	0	1	0	0
2025	PIT	15	5	51	31	20	0.0	0	3	0	–	–	–	–	1	0	0	0	0
Career		123	80	504	309	195	4.5	11	37	5	34	6.8	17	1	7	1	5	61	1

=== Postseason ===
Year	Team	Games		Tackles					Interceptions						Fumbles				
Year	Team	GP	GS	Comb	Solo	Ast	Sck	TFL	PD	Int	Yds	Avg	Lng	TD	FF	Fum	FR	Yds	TD
2018	BAL	1	0	0	0	0	0.0	0	0	0	–	–	–	–	0	0	0	0	–
2019	BAL	1	1	2	1	1	0.0	0	0	0	–	–	–	–	0	0	0	0	–
2020	BAL	**2**	**2**	**7**	**4**	**3**	0.0	**1**	0	0	–	–	–	–	0	0	0	0	–
2022	BAL	1	1	3	3	0	0.0	0	0	0	–	–	–	–	0	0	0	0	–
2025	PIT	1	1	6	3	3	0.0	**1**	**1**	0	–	–	–	–	0	0	0	0	–
Career		6	5	18	11	7	0.0	2	1	0	0	0	0	0	0	0	0	0	0

== Personal life ==
He is married to his wife, Aysha. They have four children, born in 2019, 2022, and twins born in 2025.
