= Bam Bradley =

American football player (born 1994)

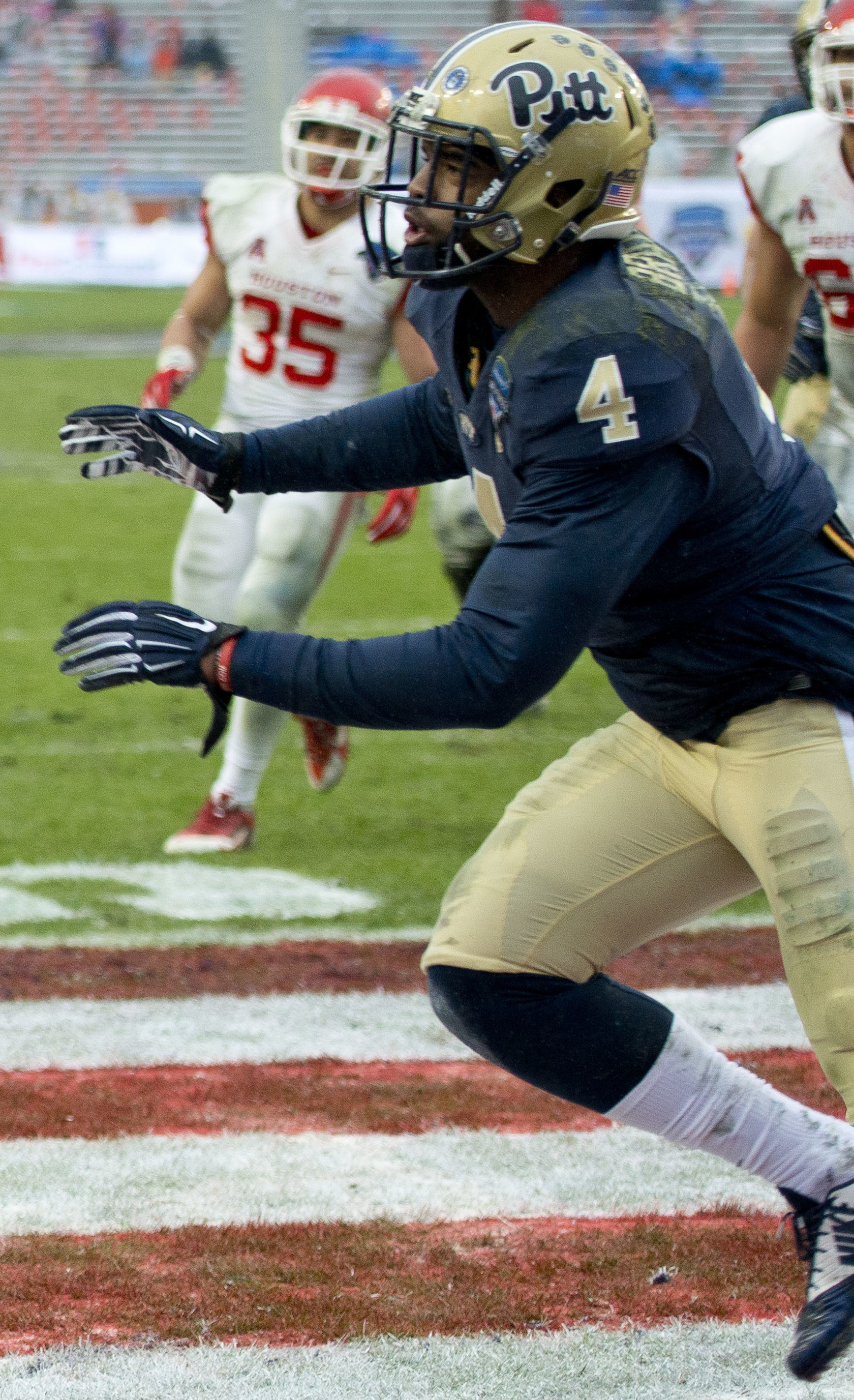
- Bradley with Pitt in 2015

No. 53
- Position: Linebacker

Personal information
- Born: June 26, 1994 (age 32); Dayton, Ohio, U.S.
- Listed height: 5 ft 11 in (1.80 m)
- Listed weight: 237 lb (108 kg)

Career information
- High school: Trotwood-Madison (Trotwood, Ohio)
- College: Pittsburgh
- NFL draft: 2017: undrafted

Career history
- Baltimore Ravens (2017–2018)

Career NFL statistics
- Games played: 2
- Stats at Pro Football Reference

George L. "Bam" Bradley II (born June 26, 1994) is an American former professional football player who was a linebacker for the Baltimore Ravens of the National Football League (NFL). He played college football for the Pittsburgh Panthers.

== High school ==
Bradley attended Trotwood-Madison High School and was a two-time Associated Press All-Ohio Division II honoree.

== College career ==
Bradley started in 8 games at Pittsburgh, finished his career with 106 tackles, 17 for loss and 4 sacks.

== Professional career ==
Bradley signed with the Baltimore Ravens as an undrafted free agent on May 5, 2017. Bradley made the Ravens 53-man roster as an undrafted rookie, but his rookie season was cut short due to injury. He suffered a torn ACL in Week 2 against the Browns and was placed on injured reserve on September 19, 2017.

On August 31, 2018, Bradley was placed on the physically unable to perform list to start the season while recovering from the torn ACL.

On March 19, 2019, Bradley was released by the Ravens.
