= Trotwood-Madison City School District =

School district in Ohio

Address
- 3594 North Snyder Road Trotwood, Ohio, 45426; United States

District information
- Type: Public
- Grades: PK–12
- Schools: 6
- NCES District ID: 3904869

Students and staff
- Students: 2,529 (2025–2026)
- Teachers: 136.61 (on an FTE basis) (2025–2026)
- Staff: 307.34 (on an FTE basis) (2025–2026)
- Student–teacher ratio: 18.51 (2025–2026)

Other information
- Website: www.trotwood.k12.oh.us

Trotwood-Madison City Schools is a school district in the U.S. state of Ohio that serves the areas of Trotwood, Dayton, Clayton, and Jefferson Township. (also including parts of the former Madison Township)

The district was created in 1923 with the consolidation of all Madison Township School Districts.

This district is entirely located in Montgomery County, Ohio.

== Active Schools ==
School Buildings:
School:	Address:	Grade Level:	Years:
Trotwood-Madison High School	4440 North Union Road, Trotwood, OH 45426	9-12	2005 -
Trotwood-Madison Middle School	4420 North Union Road, Trotwood, OH 45426	6-8	2008 -
Westbrooke Village Elementary School	6500 Westford Road, Trotwood, OH 45426	4-5	2007 -
Madison Park Elementary School	301 South Broadway Street, Trotwood, OH 45426	2-3	2007 -
Trotwood Early Learning Center	4400 North Union Road, Trotwood, OH 45426	PreK - 1	2007 -

== Former Schools ==
Former School Buildings:
School:	Address	Years:
Old Trotwood-Madison High School Trotwood Madison Senior High School Trotwood High School Madison Township High School Trotwood Elementary School	221 East Trotwood Blvd, Trotwood, Ohio 45426	1913 - 2005 add. 1923 add. 1950 add. 1959 add. 1962 add. 1968
Broadmoor Elementary School Broadmoor Academy	701 East Main Street, Trotwood, Ohio 45426	1956 - 2008 add. 1959
Townview Elementary School	5280 Gardendale Avenue, Dayton, Ohio 45427	1957 - 2008
Old Madison Park Elementary School	301 South Broadway, Trotwood, Ohio 45426	1961 - 2005
Olive View Elementary School Olive Hill Accelerated Learning School	1250 Olive Road, Dayton, Ohio 45426	1962 - 2012
Shiloh View Elementary School	5600 Elgin Roof Drive, Trotwood, Ohio 45426	1968 - 2008
Old Trotwood-Madison Middle School Trotwood Madison Junior High School	3594 North Snyder Road, Trotwood, Ohio 45426	1975 - Now Central Office- Bus Garage
Old Westbrooke Village Elementary School Westbrook Elementary School	6500 Westford Road, Trotwood, Ohio 45426	1976 - 2005
