= Dahio Trotwood Airport =

- IATA: none; ICAO: none; FAA LID: I44

Summary
- Airport type: Public
- Owner: Gary Ridell
- Serves: Dayton, Ohio
- Location: Trotwood / New Lebanon
- Elevation AMSL: 925 ft (282 m)
- Coordinates: 39°45′57″N 084°20′36″W

Map
- Location of airport in Ohio I44 (the United States)

Runways
Direction	Length		Surface
Direction	ft	m	Surface
4/22	2,900	884	Asphalt

Statistics (2007)
- Aircraft operations: 1,853
- Based aircraft: 27
- Source: Federal Aviation Administration

Dahio Trotwood Airport (FAA LID: I44), also known as Dayton-New Lebanon Airport, is a public-use airport located seven miles (11 km) west of the central business district of Dayton, in Montgomery County, Ohio, United States. It is privately owned by Gary Ridell. The airport is situated between Trotwood to the northeast and New Lebanon to the southwest.

== History ==
Dahio Airport was founded by Eejay Lauterbach, who purchased the 125-acre (51 ha) Glen Murr farm. (Note: The airport's name was a contraction of Dayton, Ohio.) Construction on the field had begun by mid May 1941. By early December, a 6,000-square-foot (560 m^{2}) hangar had been built. By mid May 1946, this had been expanded to 135-acre (55 ha) and three hangars.

It was announced in October 1947 that Skyways, Inc. would take over operation of the airport.

By late October 1957, the airport was being used as a dragstrip.

In early March 1961, the airport operator was sued for improper maintenance that caused a crash. Following the start of a tenure of a new leaseholder the previous October, a repair station at the airport had been certified by late July 1966. Miller's Flying Service moved to Myers Airport in 1969.

WING's traffic spotting airplane was based at the airport in November 1975.

The airport was leased to a new owner, renamed to Wright Aerodrome and given a new focus on hot-air balloons and ultralight aircraft in 1982. Following a subsequent purchase two years later, its name was changed again to Dayton-New Lebanon Airport.

In 2000, the airport was purchased by Gary Riddell, who developed a type of fuel pellet for use in power plants. He planned to build a proof-of-concept plant at the site to produce them while also maintaining its use as an airport. By mid June 2003, it was being known as Dahio Trotwood Airport. A Cessna Crane I, which belonged to the Wright Stuff Squadron of the Commemorative Air Force, was being restored at the airport in 2005. The Wright Brothers Airplane Company, a nonprofit aviation history group, considered basing itself at the airport in 2006.

== Facilities and aircraft ==
Dahio Trotwood Airport covers an area of 132 acres (53 ha) which contains one asphalt paved runway measuring 2,900 ft × 52 ft (884 m × 16 m).

There is no fixed-base operator at the airport.

For the 12-month period ending May 29, 2007, the airport had 1,853 aircraft operations, an average of 5 per day, 100% which were general aviation. There are 27 aircraft based at this airport: 16 single-engine airplanes, 10 ultralights, and 1 multi-engine airplane.

== Accidents & incidents ==
- On 22 July 1954, a four passenger airplane crashed after taking off from the airport, injuring the pilot and a passenger.
- On 18 August 1957, a racecar crashed during a record attempt at the airport, killing the driver.
- On 1 November 1987, an ultralight crashed while taking off from the airport due to structural failure, critically injuring the pilot.

== See also ==
- List of airports in Ohio
