= Don Martindale =

American football coach (born 1963)

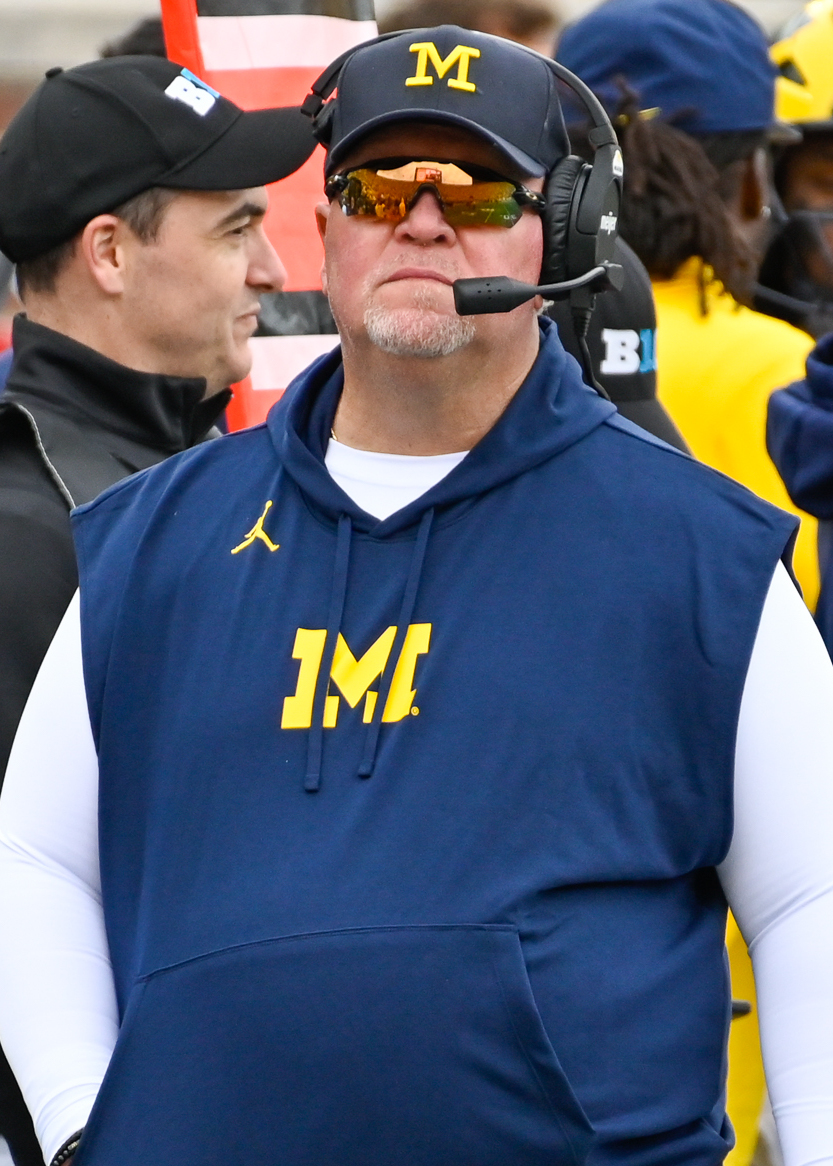
- Martindale with the Michigan Wolverines in 2024

Biographical details
- Born: May 19, 1963 (age 63); Dayton, Ohio, U.S.

Playing career
- c. 1985: Defiance
- Position: Linebacker

Coaching career (HC unless noted)
- 1986–1987: Defiance (DC)
- 1994–1995: Notre Dame (assistant)
- 1996–1998: Cincinnati (STC/LB)
- 1999: Western Illinois (DC/LB)
- 2000–2003: Western Kentucky (DC/ILB)
- 2004–2008: Oakland Raiders (LB)
- 2009: Denver Broncos (LB)
- 2010: Denver Broncos (DC)
- 2012–2017: Baltimore Ravens (LB)
- 2018–2021: Baltimore Ravens (DC)
- 2022–2023: New York Giants (DC)
- 2024–2025: Michigan (DC)

Don "Wink" Martindale (born May 19, 1963) is an American football coach. He served as the Defensive Coordinator at the University of Michigan in 2024 and 2025. Previously, he had been Defensive Coordinator for the New York Giants and Baltimore Ravens of the National Football League (NFL) from 2018 to 2023.

== Early years ==
Don Martindale was born on May 19, 1963, in Dayton, Ohio. He attended Trotwood-Madison High School, where he played linebacker for the Trotwood-Madison Rams and was an All-State selection his senior year.

He is an alumnus of Defiance College, where he played on the football team. He got his nickname during his freshman year, when one of his teammates called him "Wink" after the longtime TV game show host, Wink Martindale.

Right after college, Martindale took a job with his family's trucking company, hauling brake parts every day from Dayton, Ohio, to Detroit. It was a grueling six hour drive round-trip and he hated it, so he quit after a year to pursue his passion for coaching football.

== Coaching career ==
=== College ===
Martindale began his coaching career in the late 1980s at his alma mater, Defiance College, as an assistant for the Yellow Jackets. In 1994 and 1995, he was a defensive assistant at Notre Dame for teams that went to the Fiesta Bowl and Orange Bowl. He went on to coach for three years at the University of Cincinnati, and then spent a year coaching for Western Illinois University. He then spent a year as an assistant coach at Archbishop Alter High School in Kettering, Ohio. Martindale's first stint in college football ended after he coached for three seasons at Western Kentucky University under head coach Jack Harbaugh.

=== Oakland Raiders ===
From 2004 to 2008, he was the linebackers coach for the Oakland Raiders. In January 2009, he was under consideration to be their defensive coordinator, while there was talk that owner Al Davis considered Martindale for head coach. (The last coach promoted from linebackers coach to head coach by Davis was Super Bowl XI-winning coach John Madden.)

=== Denver Broncos ===
In January 2009, Martindale was hired by his prior team's division rival, the Denver Broncos, as their linebackers coach. In January 2010, he was promoted to defensive coordinator.

=== Baltimore Ravens ===
On February 2, 2012, the Ravens signed Martindale as linebackers coach. Don had worked under Ravens' head coach John Harbaugh's father, Jack, when he was defensive coordinator at Western Kentucky.

Martindale was part of the Ravens' coaching staff that won Super Bowl XLVII. In January 2018, he was promoted to defensive coordinator. On January 21, 2022, Martindale and the Ravens parted ways.

=== New York Giants ===
On February 11, 2022, Martindale was hired by the New York Giants to be their defensive coordinator. In his first season, the Giants improved from having the 23rd ranked defense in 2021, to the 18th ranked defense in 2022.

On May 22, 2023, Martindale was honored with the 2023 Paul "Dr. Z" Zimmerman Award, which is presented for lifetime achievement as an NFL assistant coach. In the 2023 season, the team finished 6–11, while their defense fell to 27th in the league. Despite their struggles, the Giants were the 9th-ranked third down defense.

On January 10, 2024, the Giants and Martindale mutually agreed to part ways.

=== Michigan ===
On February 9, 2024, Martindale was named defensive coordinator at the University of Michigan by Sherrone Moore. This marked his return to college football after 21 years with the NFL. On December 10, 2025, Moore was fired as head coach at Michigan, and Martindale was not retained for the next season.

== Personal life ==
Martindale and his wife, Laura, have two children.
