= 2020 Baltimore Ravens season =

25th season in franchise history

- Owner: Steve Bisciotti
- General manager: Eric DeCosta
- Head coach: John Harbaugh
- Offensive coordinator: Greg Roman
- Defensive coordinator: Don Martindale
- Home stadium: M&T Bank Stadium

Results
- Record: 11–5
- Division place: 2nd AFC North
- Playoffs: Won Wild Card Playoffs (at Titans) 20–13; Lost Divisional Playoffs (at Bills) 3–17
- All-Pros: 2: LS Morgan Cox (1st team); K Justin Tucker (2nd team)
- Pro Bowlers: 7: FB Patrick Ricard; T Orlando Brown Jr.; DT Calais Campbell; OLB Matthew Judon; CB Marlon Humphrey; K Justin Tucker; LS Morgan Cox
- Team MVP: QB Lamar Jackson

Uniform
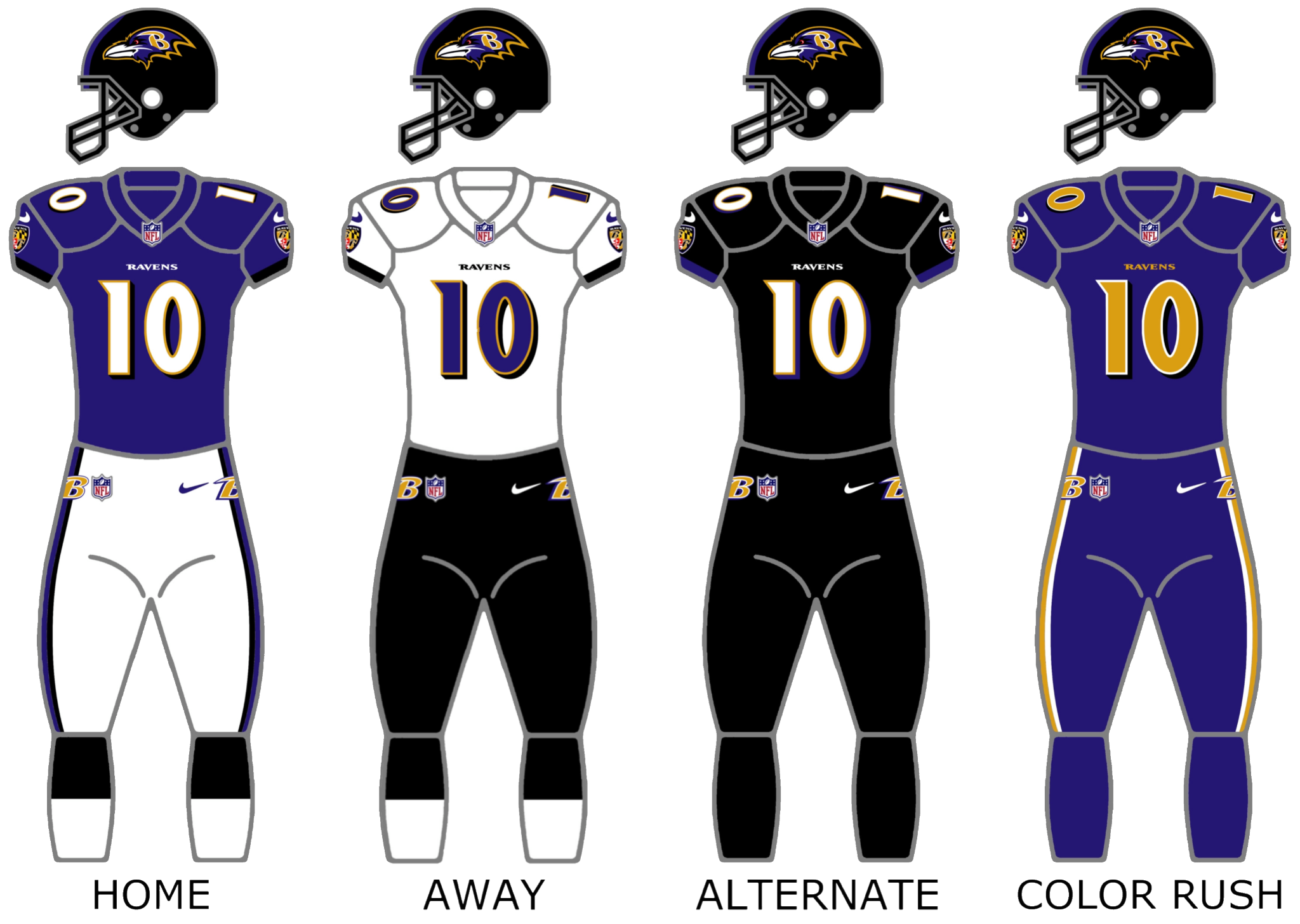

The 2020 season was the Baltimore Ravens' 25th in the National Football League (NFL) and their 13th under head coach John Harbaugh. They failed to improve upon their franchise-best 14–2 regular season and were denied their third consecutive AFC North title following a loss to the Pittsburgh Steelers in Week 12 after 18 of their players contracted COVID-19. Despite this, as well as a 6–5 start, the Ravens won their five remaining games to finish 11–5 and after a win over the Cincinnati Bengals in Week 17, clinched their third consecutive playoff berth. The Ravens rushed for 3,071 yds during the regular season, best in the NFL for the second consecutive season.

In the playoffs, the Ravens defeated the Tennessee Titans 20–13 in the wild-card round, avenging their Divisional round loss to the Titans from the previous year. The win marked quarterback Lamar Jackson's first career playoff victory and was the Ravens' first win in the playoffs since beating the Pittsburgh Steelers in the 2014–15 NFL playoffs. Baltimore's season would end in the divisional round for the second straight year, this time to the Buffalo Bills by a score of 17–3.

== Offseason ==
=== Players added ===
Position	Player	Tag	2019 team	Date
DE	Calais Campbell	Traded	Jacksonville Jaguars	March 15
LS	Nick Moore	UFA/XFL	Tampa Bay Vipers	March 26
DE	Derek Wolfe	UFA	Denver Broncos	March 28
ILB	Jake Ryan	UFA	Jacksonville Jaguars	May 4
OT	Parker Ehinger	UFA	Baltimore Ravens	July 28
TE	Jerell Adams	UFA	New Orleans Saints	August 3
RB	Kenjon Barner	UFA	Atlanta Falcons	August 12

=== Players lost ===
Position	Player	Tag	2020 team	Date
TE	Hayden Hurst	Traded	Atlanta Falcons	March 16
OT	James Hurst	Released	New Orleans Saints	March 16
CB	Brandon Carr	Team Declined Option	Dallas Cowboys	March 16
WR	Seth Roberts	UFA	Carolina Panthers	March 18
NT	Michael Pierce	UFA	Minnesota Vikings	March 18
DE	Chris Wormley	Traded	Pittsburgh Steelers	March 20
ILB	Josh Bynes	UFA	Cincinnati Bengals	March 24
ILB	Patrick Onwuasor	UFA	New York Jets	March 25
DE	Ufomba Kamalu	Released		April 8
ILB	Jake Ryan	Released		June 11
S	Earl Thomas	Released		August 23

== 2020 NFL draft ==
2020 Baltimore Ravens Draft
Round	Selection	Player	Position	College	Notes
1	28	Patrick Queen	LB	LSU	
2	55	J. K. Dobbins	RB	Ohio State	
3	71	Justin Madubuike	DT	Texas A&M	from New England
3	92	Devin Duvernay	WR	Texas	
3	98	Malik Harrison	LB	Ohio State	from New England
3	106	Tyre Phillips	OT	Mississippi State	
4	143	Ben Bredeson	OG	Michigan	
5	170	Broderick Washington Jr.	DT	Texas Tech	from Minnesota
6	201	James Proche	WR	SMU	from Minnesota
7	219	Geno Stone	S	Iowa	from Miami via Minnesota

Trades:

- The Ravens traded a seventh-round selection to the Green Bay Packers in exchange for running back Ty Montgomery.
- The Ravens traded guard Alex Lewis to the New York Jets in exchange for a conditional seventh-round selection.
- The Ravens traded kicker/punter Kaare Vedvik to the Minnesota Vikings in exchange for Minnesota's fifth-round selection.
- The Ravens traded their sixth-round selection and offensive lineman Jermaine Eluemunor to the New England Patriots in exchange for New England's fourth-round selection.
- The Ravens traded their fourth-round selection and tight end Hayden Hurst to the Atlanta Falcons in exchange for Atlanta's second-round and fifth-round selections (55th and 157th overall).
- The Ravens traded the fifth-round selection they received from the Atlanta Falcons to the Jacksonville Jaguars in exchange for defensive end Calais Campbell.
- The Ravens traded their second- and fourth-round selections (60th and 129th overall) to the New England Patriots in exchange for New England's third-round selections (71st and 98th overall).
- The Ravens traded their seventh-round selection (225th overall) and the 2021 fifth-round pick they acquired from the Pittsburgh Steelers to the Minnesota Vikings in exchange for Minnesota's sixth- and seventh-round selections (201st and 219th overall).

=== Undrafted free agents ===
2020 Baltimore Ravens Undrafted Free Agents
Player	Position	College	Notes
Tyler Huntley	QB	Utah	
Bronson Rechsteiner	FB	Kennesaw State	
Jaylon Moore	WR	UT Martin	
Michael Dereus	WR	Georgetown	
Jacob Breeland	TE	Oregon	
Eli Wolf	TE	Georgia	
Evan Adams	OL	Syracuse	
Daishawn Dixon	OL	San Diego State	
Trystan Colon	C	Missouri	
Sean Pollard	C	Clemson	
Aaron Crawford	DT	North Carolina	
John Daka	DE	James Madison	
Chauncey Rivers	DE	Mississippi State	
Marcus Willoughby	DE	Elon	
Kristian Welch	ILB	Iowa	
Jeff Hector	CB	Redlands	
Josh Nurse	CB	Utah	
Khalil Dorsey	CB	Northern Arizona	
Nigel Warrior	S	Tennessee	
Nick Vogel	K	UAB	
Dom Maggio	P	Wake Forest	

== Staff ==
2020 Baltimore Ravens staff
Front office: Owner – Steve Bisciotti; President – Dick Cass; Executive vice president/general manager – Eric DeCosta; Executive vice president/player personnel – Ozzie Newsome; Senior vice president of football administration – Pat Moriarty; Director of pro personnel – Vince Newsome; Director of college scouting – Joe Hortiz; Director of football administration – Nick Matteo; Director of compliance – Jessica Markison; Senior personnel assistant – George Kokinis; Director of football information – Megan McLaughlin; Director of football research – Scott Cohen; Head coaches: Head coach – John Harbaugh; Assistant head coach/passing game coordinator/wide receivers – David Culley; Assistant to the head coach – Dan Parsons; Offensive coaches: Offensive coordinator – Greg Roman; Quarterbacks – James Urban; Running backs – Matt Weiss; Tight ends – Bobby Engram; Assistant tight ends – Andy Bischoff; Offensive line – Joe D'Alessandris; Assistant offensive line – Richard Angulo; Senior assistant/running backs – Craig Ver Steeg	Defensive coaches: Defensive coordinator – Don Martindale; Defensive line – Joe Cullen; Linebackers – Mike MacDonald; Outside linebackers – Drew Wilkins; Passing defense coordinator – Chris Hewitt; Defensive backs – Jesse Minter; Defensive assistant/defensive line – Sterling Lucas; Special teams coaches: Special teams coordinator – Chris Horton; Assistant special teams – T. J. Weist; Special teams – Randy Brown; Strength and conditioning: Head strength and conditioning – Steve Saunders; Assistant strength and conditioning – Anthony Watson; Coaching analyst – performance – Scott Elliott; Coaching analyst – performance – Sam Rosengarten; Coaching analyst – performance – Ron Shrift

== Final roster ==
2020 Baltimore Ravens roster
Quarterbacks (QB): 2 Tyler Huntley; 8 Lamar Jackson; Running backs (RB): 27 J. K. Dobbins; 35 Gus Edwards; 43 Justice Hill; 21 Mark Ingram II; 42 Patrick Ricard; Wide receivers (WR): 80 Miles Boykin; 15 Marquise Brown; 88 Dez Bryant; 13 Devin Duvernay; 10 Chris Moore; 11 James Proche; 83 Willie Snead; Tight ends (TE): 89 Mark Andrews; 85 Eric Tomlinson	Offensive linemen (OL): 77 Bradley Bozeman G; 78 Orlando Brown T; 63 Trystan Colon-Castillo C; 70 D. J. Fluker T; 65 Patrick Mekari C; 74 Tyre Phillips T; 72 Ben Powers G; 68 Matt Skura C; Defensive linemen (DL): 93 Calais Campbell DE; 71 Justin Ellis NT; 92 Justin Madubuike DE; 53 Jihad Ward DE; 96 Broderick Washington DE; 98 Brandon Williams NT; 95 Derek Wolfe DE	Linebackers (LB): 49 Chris Board ILB; 54 Tyus Bowser OLB; 45 Jaylon Ferguson OLB; 58 L. J. Fort ILB; 40 Malik Harrison ILB; 99 Matthew Judon OLB; 90 Pernell McPhee OLB; 91 Yannick Ngakoue OLB; 48 Patrick Queen ILB; 57 Kristian Welch ILB; Defensive backs (DB): 23 Anthony Averett CB; 36 Chuck Clark SS; 32 DeShon Elliott FS; 44 Marlon Humphrey CB; 41 Anthony Levine SS; 24 Marcus Peters CB; 28 Jordan Richards FS; 22 Jimmy Smith CB; 29 Tramon Williams CB; Special teams (ST): 46 Morgan Cox LS; 4 Sam Koch P; 6 Johnny Townsend P; 9 Justin Tucker K	Practice squad: 51 Aaron Adeoye OLB; 38 Terrell Bonds CB; 69 Aaron Crawford DE; 84 Sean Culkin TE; 47 Pierre Desir CB; 64 Parker Ehinger T (PS/I); 30 Jayron Kearse SS; 62 Greg Mancz C; 76 Jordan Mills T; 81 Jaylon Moore WR; 60 Nick Moore LS; 61 R. J. Prince T; 97 Chauncey Rivers OLB; 39 Nigel Warrior SS; 34 Ty'Son Williams RB; 87 Eli Wolf TE; Reserve: 50 Otaro Alaka ILB (IR); 86 Nick Boyle TE (IR); 67 Ben Bredeson G (IR); 88 Jake Breeland TE (NF-Inj.); 31 Khalil Dorsey CB (IR); 3 Robert Griffin III QB (IR); 33 Davontae Harris CB (IR/DFR); 37 Iman Marshall CB (IR); 7 Trace McSorley QB (IR); 76 Andre Smith T (Opt-out); 79 Ronnie Stanley T (IR); 16 De'Anthony Thomas WR (Opt-out); 84 Antoine Wesley WR (IR); 18 DeAndrew White WR (IR); 25 Tavon Young CB (IR); Rookies in italics 54 active, 15 reserve, 15 practice squad (1 exempt)

== Preseason ==
The Ravens' preseason schedule was announced on May 7, but was later canceled due to the COVID-19 pandemic.

Week	Date	Opponent	Venue	Result
1	August 14	Buffalo Bills	M&T Bank Stadium	Canceled due to the COVID-19 pandemic
2	August 22	at Dallas Cowboys	AT&T Stadium	Canceled due to the COVID-19 pandemic
3	August 30	Carolina Panthers	M&T Bank Stadium	Canceled due to the COVID-19 pandemic
4	September 3	at Washington Football Team	FedEx Field	Canceled due to the COVID-19 pandemic

== Regular season ==
=== Schedule ===
The Ravens' 2020 schedule was announced on May 7.

Week	Date	Opponent	Result	Record	Venue	Recap
1	September 13	**Cleveland Browns**	**W** 38–6	1–0	M&T Bank Stadium	Recap
2	September 20	at Houston Texans	**W** 33–16	2–0	NRG Stadium	Recap
3	September 28	Kansas City Chiefs	**L** 20–34	2–1	M&T Bank Stadium	Recap
4	October 4	at Washington Football Team	**W** 31–17	3–1	FedExField	Recap
5	October 11	**Cincinnati Bengals**	**W** 27–3	4–1	M&T Bank Stadium	Recap
6	October 18	at Philadelphia Eagles	**W** 30–28	5–1	Lincoln Financial Field	Recap
7	Bye (Note: The Ravens' home game vs. the Pittsburgh Steelers, originally scheduled during Week 7 (October 25), was moved to Week 8 (November 1), which was the original bye week for both teams. The scheduling change was made due to a COVID-19 outbreak within the Tennessee Titans' organization that forced the Steelers–Titans game, originally scheduled during Week 4, to be moved to Week 7.)					
8	November 1	**Pittsburgh Steelers**	**L** 24–28	5–2	M&T Bank Stadium	Recap
9	November 8	at Indianapolis Colts	**W** 24–10	6–2	Lucas Oil Stadium	Recap
10	November 15	at New England Patriots	**L** 17–23	6–3	Gillette Stadium	Recap
11	November 22	Tennessee Titans	**L** 24–30 (OT)	6–4	M&T Bank Stadium	Recap
12 (Note: The Ravens' away game vs. the Pittsburgh Steelers, originally scheduled for November 26 on Thanksgiving, was moved to November 29 then December 1, and then finally December 2. The scheduling change was made due to a COVID-19 outbreak within the Ravens' organization as seven players tested positive. This forced the Ravens' Week 13 game vs. the Dallas Cowboys, originally scheduled for Thursday Night Football on December 3, to be pushed back to December 8.)	December 2	at **Pittsburgh Steelers**	**L** 14–19	6–5	Heinz Field	Recap
13	December 8	Dallas Cowboys	**W** 34–17	7–5	M&T Bank Stadium	Recap
14	December 14	at **Cleveland Browns**	**W** 47–42	8–5	FirstEnergy Stadium	Recap
15	December 20	Jacksonville Jaguars	**W** 40–14	9–5	M&T Bank Stadium	Recap
16	December 27	New York Giants	**W** 27–13	10–5	M&T Bank Stadium	Recap
17	January 3	at **Cincinnati Bengals**	**W** 38–3	11–5	Paul Brown Stadium	Recap

Note: Intra-division opponents are in bold text.

=== Game summaries ===
==== Week 1: Baltimore Ravens 38, Cleveland Browns 6 ====
Week 1: Cleveland Browns at Baltimore Ravens – Game summary

Quarter	1	2	3	4	Total
Browns	6	0	0	0	**6**
**Ravens**	10	14	7	7	**38**

at M&T Bank Stadium, Baltimore, Maryland

- Date: September 13
- Game time: 1:00 p.m. EDT
- Game weather: Partly cloudy, 76 °F (24 °C)
- Game attendance: 0
- Referee: Ronald Torbert
- TV announcers (CBS): Ian Eagle, Charles Davis, and Evan Washburn
- Recap, Game Book

Game information

**First quarter**

- BAL – Mark Andrews 5-yard pass from Lamar Jackson (Justin Tucker kick), 7:41. Ravens 7–0. **Drive: 8 plays, 49 yards, 4:38.**
- BAL – Justin Tucker 41-yard field goal, 4:38. Ravens 10–0. **Drive: 4 plays, 3 yards, 1:30.**
- CLE – David Njoku 1-yard pass from Baker Mayfield (kick failed), 1:41. Ravens 10–6. **Drive: 6 plays, 75 yards, 2:57.**

**Second quarter**

- BAL – J. K. Dobbins 3-yard run (Justin Tucker kick), 2:53. Ravens 17–6. **Drive: 10 plays, 99 yards, 5:48.**
- BAL – Mark Andrews 9-yard pass from Lamar Jackson (Justin Tucker kick), 0:06. Ravens 24–6. **Drive: 7 plays, 69 yards, 0:35.**

**Third quarter**

- BAL – Willie Snead IV 19-yard pass from Lamar Jackson (Justin Tucker kick), 7:48. Ravens 31–6. **Drive: 6 plays, 50 yards, 3:23.**

**Fourth quarter**

- BAL – J. K. Dobbins 2-yard run (Justin Tucker kick), 13:00. Ravens 38–6. **Drive: 4 plays, 20 yards, 2:00.**

**Top passers**

- CLE – Baker Mayfield – 21/39, 189 yards, TD, INT
- BAL – Lamar Jackson – 20/25, 275 yards, 3 TD

**Top rushers**

- CLE – Kareem Hunt – 13 rushes, 72 yards
- BAL – Lamar Jackson – 7 rushes, 45 yards

**Top receivers**

- CLE – Jarvis Landry – 5 receptions, 61 yards
- BAL – Marquise Brown – 5 receptions, 101 yards

Lamar Jackson went 20 for 25 for 275 yards and 3 touchdowns and was named AFC Offensive Player of the Week. With the 38–6 win, the Ravens became the first team in NFL history to win three consecutive season openers by 30 points or more and the only NFL team to have scored at least 20 points in their last 24 regular season games.

==== Week 2: Baltimore Ravens 33, Houston Texans 16 ====
Week 2: Baltimore Ravens at Houston Texans – Game summary

Quarter	1	2	3	4	Total
**Ravens**	3	17	3	10	**33**
Texans	0	10	0	6	**16**

at NRG Stadium, Houston, Texas

- Date: September 20
- Game time: 4:25 p.m. EDT/3:25 p.m. CDT
- Game weather: None (retractable roof closed)
- Game attendance: 0
- Referee: Tony Corrente
- TV announcers (CBS): Kevin Harlan, Trent Green, and Melanie Collins
- Recap, Game Book

Game information

**First quarter**

- BAL – Justin Tucker 32-yard field goal, 1:14. Ravens 3–0. **Drive: 12 plays, 73 yards, 6:57.**

**Second quarter**

- BAL – Patrick Ricard 1-yard pass from Lamar Jackson (Justin Tucker kick), 12:55. Ravens 10–0. **Drive: 4 plays, 34 yards, 2:05.**
- HOU – Darren Fells 10-yard pass from Deshaun Watson (Kaʻimi Fairbairn kick), 9:45. Ravens 10–7. **Drive: 7 plays, 75 yards, 3:10.**
- BAL – Justin Tucker 39-yard field goal, 5:31. Ravens 13–7. **Drive: 9 plays, 58 yards, 4:14.**
- BAL – L. J. Fort 22-yard fumble return (Justin Tucker kick), 5:16. Ravens 20–7.
- BAL – Kaʻimi Fairbairn 44-yard field goal, 0:00. Ravens 20–10. **Drive: 7 plays, 63 yards, 1:06.**

**Third quarter**

- BAL – Justin Tucker 47-yard field goal, 6:24. Ravens 23–10. **Drive: 14 plays, 60 yards, 8:36.**

**Fourth quarter**

- HOU – Kaʻimi Fairbairn 35-yard field goal, 14:47. Ravens 23–13. **Drive: 14 plays, 58 yards, 6:37.**
- BAL – Mark Ingram II 30-yard run (Justin Tucker kick), 11:58. Ravens 30–13. **Drive: 6 plays, 75 yards, 2:49.**
- HOU – Kaʻimi Fairbairn 45-yard field goal, 8:13. Ravens 30–16. **Drive: 10 plays, 49 yards, 3:45.**
- BAL – Justin Tucker 20-yard field goal, 3:44. Ravens 33–16. **Drive: 13 plays, 71 yards, 4:29.**

**Top passers**

- BAL – Lamar Jackson – 18/24, 204 yards, TD
- HOU – Deshaun Watson – 25/36, 275 yards, TD, INT

**Top rushers**

- BAL – Gus Edwards – 10 rushes, 73 yards
- HOU – David Johnson – 11 rushes, 34 yards

**Top receivers**

- BAL – Marquise Brown – 5 receptions, 42 yards
- HOU – Brandin Cooks – 5 receptions, 95 yards

The Ravens defense dominated the Texans, sacking Watson 4 times, with one interception and one fumble returned for a touchdown. Houston was limited to 51 yards total rushing, compared to the Ravens' 230 yards.

==== Week 3: Kansas City Chiefs 34, Baltimore Ravens 20 ====
Week 3: Kansas City Chiefs at Baltimore Ravens – Game summary

Quarter	1	2	3	4	Total
**Chiefs**	6	21	0	7	**34**
Ravens	3	7	3	7	**20**

at M&T Bank Stadium, Baltimore, Maryland

- Date: September 28
- Game time: 8:15 p.m. EDT
- Game weather: Mostly Cloudy, 73 °F (23 °C)
- Game attendance: 250
- Referee: John Hussey
- TV announcers (ESPN): Steve Levy, Brian Griese, Louis Riddick, and Lisa Salters
- Recap, Game Book

Game information

**First quarter**

- BAL – Justin Tucker 26-yard field goal, 9:20. Ravens 3–0. **Drive: 11 plays, 67 yards, 5:40.**
- KC – Patrick Mahomes 3-yard run (kick failed), 6:43. Chiefs 6–3. **Drive: 6 plays, 75 yards, 2:37.**

**Second quarter**

- KC – Anthony Sherman 5-yard pass from Patrick Mahomes (Harrison Butker kick), 12:52. Chiefs 13–3. **Drive: 13 plays, 68 yards, 6:20.**
- BAL – Devin Duvernay 93-yard kickoff return (Justin Tucker kick), 12:40. Chiefs 13–10.
- KC – Tyreek Hill 20-yard pass from Patrick Mahomes (Harrison Butker kick), 6:40. Chiefs 20–10. **Drive: 6 plays, 73 yards, 3:26.**
- KC – Mecole Hardman 49-yard pass from Patrick Mahomes (Harrison Butker kick), 1:48. Chiefs 27–10. **Drive: 7 plays, 84 yards, 2:51.**

**Third quarter**

- BAL – Justin Tucker 42-yard field goal, 6:13. Chiefs 27–13. **Drive: 12 plays, 55 yards, 6:43.**

**Fourth quarter**

- BAL – Nick Boyle 5-yard pass from Lamar Jackson (Justin Tucker kick), 14:55. Chiefs 27–20. **Drive: 6 plays, 49 yards, 3:02.**
- KC – Eric Fisher 2-yard pass from Patrick Mahomes (Harrison Butker kick), 8:14. Chiefs 34–20. **Drive: 13 plays, 75 yards, 6:41.**

**Top passers**

- KC – Patrick Mahomes – 31/42, 385 yards, 4 TD
- BAL – Lamar Jackson – 15/28, 97 yards, TD

**Top rushers**

- KC – Clyde Edwards-Helaire – 20 rush, 64 yards
- BAL – Lamar Jackson – 9 rushes, 83 yards

**Top receivers**

- KC – Travis Kelce – 6 receptions, 87 yards
- BAL – J. K. Dobbins – 4 receptions, 38 yards

This loss snapped a 14-game regular season winning streak dating back to week 4 of last season; it also dropped Jackson's record as a starter to 0–3 against Patrick Mahomes and the Chiefs. It was the Ravens' only multi-score loss of the season.

==== Week 4: Baltimore Ravens 31, Washington Football Team 17 ====
Week 4: Baltimore Ravens at Washington Football Team – Game summary

Quarter	1	2	3	4	Total
**Ravens**	7	14	7	3	**31**
Washington	0	10	0	7	**17**

at FedExField, Landover, Maryland

- Date: October 4
- Game time: 1:00 p.m. EDT
- Game weather: Sunny, 65 °F (18 °C)
- Game attendance: 0
- Referee: Adrian Hill
- TV announcers (CBS): Andrew Catalon, James Lofton, and AJ Ross
- Recap, Game Book

Game information

**First quarter**

- BAL – Mark Ingram II 1-yard run (Justin Tucker kick), 2:09. Ravens 7–0. **Drive: 2 plays, 34 yards, 0:42.**

**Second quarter**

- BAL – Lamar Jackson 50-yard run (Justin Tucker kick), 9:56. Ravens 14–0. **Drive: 3 plays, 56 yards, 1:30.**
- WAS – Antonio Gibson 2-yard run (Dustin Hopkins kick), 4:41. Ravens 14–7. **Drive: 10 plays, 75 yards, 5:15.**
- BAL – Mark Andrews 25-yard pass from Lamar Jackson (Justin Tucker kick), 1:49. Ravens 21–7. **Drive: 8 plays, 75 yards, 2:52.**
- WAS – Dustin Hopkins 43-yard field goal, 0:00. Ravens 21–10. **Drive: 3 plays, 12 yards, 0:30.**

**Third quarter**

- BAL – Mark Andrews 22-yard pass from Lamar Jackson (Justin Tucker kick), 8:42. Ravens 28–10. **Drive: 10 plays, 75 yards, 6:18.**

**Fourth quarter**

- BAL – Justin Tucker 46-yard field goal, 5:16. Ravens 31–10. **Drive: 10 plays, 64 yards, 6:19.**
- WAS – Dwayne Haskins 1-yard run (Dustin Hopkins kick), 2:05. Ravens 31–17. **Drive: 4 plays, 42 yards, 1:24.**

**Top passers**

- BAL – Lamar Jackson – 14/21, 193 yards, 2 TD, INT
- WAS – Dwayne Haskins – 32/45, 314 yards

**Top rushers**

- BAL – Lamar Jackson – 7 rushes, 53 yards, TD
- WAS – Antonio Gibson – 13 rushes, 46 yards, TD

**Top receivers**

- BAL – Marquise Brown – 4 receptions, 86 yards
- WAS – Terry McLaurin – 10 receptions, 118 yards

Lamar Jackson threw for 193 yards and 2 touchdowns, rushed for 52 yards and 1 touchdown making him the fastest player in NFL history to reach 5,000 yards passing and 2,000 yards rushing.

==== Week 5: Baltimore Ravens 27, Cincinnati Bengals 3 ====
Week 5: Cincinnati Bengals at Baltimore Ravens – Game summary

Quarter	1	2	3	4	Total
Bengals	0	0	0	3	**3**
**Ravens**	10	7	3	7	**27**

at M&T Bank Stadium, Baltimore, Maryland

- Date: October 11
- Game time: 1:00 p.m. EDT
- Game weather: Cloudy, 69 °F (21 °C)
- Game attendance: 0
- Referee: Jerome Boger
- TV announcers (CBS): Greg Gumbel, Rich Gannon, and Amanda Balionis
- Recap, Game Book

Game information

**First quarter**

- BAL – Justin Tucker 46-yard field goal, 10:40. Ravens 3–0. **Drive: 6 plays, 52 yards, 2:07.**
- BAL – Mark Andrews 5-yard pass from Lamar Jackson (Justin Tucker kick), 0:40. Ravens 10–0. **Drive: 15 plays, 62 yards, 7:19.**

**Second quarter**

- BAL – Marquise Brown 2-yard pass from Lamar Jackson (Justin Tucker kick), 14:56. Ravens 17–0. **Drive: 2 plays, 31 yards, 0:24.**

**Third quarter**

- BAL – Justin Tucker 39-yard field goal, 2:36. Ravens 20–0. **Drive: 7 plays, 44 yards, 3:32.**

**Fourth quarter**

- BAL – Patrick Queen 53-yard fumble return (Justin Tucker kick), 8:21. Ravens 27–0.
- CIN – Randy Bullock 38-yard field goal, 0:32. Ravens 27–3. **Drive: 14 plays, 55 yards, 7:49.**

**Top passers**

- CIN – Joe Burrow – 19/30, 183, INT
- BAL – Lamar Jackson – 19/37, 180, 2 TD, INT

**Top rushers**

- CIN – Joe Mixon – 24 rushes, 59 yards
- BAL – Mark Ingram II – 11 rushes, 57 yards

**Top receivers**

- CIN – Tee Higgins – 4 receptions, 62 yards
- BAL – Marquise Brown – 6 receptions, 77 yards, TD

Baltimore's defense dominated the matchup, sacking rookie Bengals' QB Joe Burrow seven times and allowing just 3 points in a blowout win. It also was the Ravens' fourth straight win over the Bengals.

==== Week 6: Baltimore Ravens 30, Philadelphia Eagles 28 ====
Week 6: Baltimore Ravens at Philadelphia Eagles – Game summary

Quarter	1	2	3	4	Total
**Ravens**	14	3	7	6	**30**
Eagles	0	0	6	22	**28**

at Lincoln Financial Field, Philadelphia, Pennsylvania

- Date: October 18
- Game time: 1:00 p.m. EDT
- Game weather: Sunny, 63 °F (17 °C)
- Game attendance: 5,000
- Referee: Shawn Smith
- TV announcers (CBS): Ian Eagle, Charles Davis and Evan Washburn
- Recap, Game Book

Game information

**First quarter**

- BAL – Nick Boyle 7-yard pass from Lamar Jackson (Justin Tucker kick), 8:02. Ravens 7–0. **Drive: 9 plays, 47 yards, 5:13.**
- BAL – Gus Edwards 7-yard run (Justin Tucker kick), 0:31. Ravens 14–0. **Drive: 5 plays, 28 yards, 2:23.**

**Second quarter**

- BAL – Justin Tucker 46-yard field goal, 12:08. Ravens 17–0. **Drive: 5 plays, 35 yards, 2:00.**

**Third quarter**

- PHI – J. J. Arcega-Whiteside fumble recovery in end zone (run failed), 7:17. Ravens 17–6. **Drive: 2 plays, 86 yards, 0:53.**
- BAL – Lamar Jackson 37-yard run (Justin Tucker kick), 4:25. Ravens 24–6. **Drive: 5 plays, 63 yards, 2:52.**

**Fourth quarter**

- PHI – Jason Croom 3-yard pass from Carson Wentz (Carson Wentz–Greg Ward pass), 13:32. Ravens 24–14. **Drive: 12 plays, 81 yards, 3:04.**
- BAL – Justin Tucker 55-yard field goal, 10:01. Ravens 27–14. **Drive: 7 plays, 38 yards, 3:31.**
- BAL – Justin Tucker 46-yard field goal, 7:12. Ravens 30–14. **Drive: 4 plays, 2 yards, 2:07.**
- PHI – Travis Fulgham 18-yard pass from Carson Wentz (Carson Wentz–J. J. Arcega-Whiteside pass), 3:48. Ravens 30–22. **Drive: 11 plays, 75 yards, 3:24.**
- PHI – Carson Wentz 1-yard run (run failed), 1:55. Ravens 30–28. **Drive: 4 plays, 71 yards, 1:16.**

**Top passers**

- BAL – Lamar Jackson – 16/27, 186 yards, TD
- PHI – Carson Wentz – 21/40, 213 yards, 2 TD

**Top rushers**

- BAL – Lamar Jackson – 9 rushes, 108 yards, TD
- PHI – Miles Sanders – 9 rushes, 118 yards

**Top receivers**

- BAL – Marquise Brown – 4 receptions, 57 yards
- PHI – Travis Fulgham – 6 receptions, 75 yards, TD

After taking a 17–0 halftime lead, Baltimore survived a furious second-half rally from the Eagles, stopping a two-point conversion, recovering the ensuing onside kick, and getting a first down in the final two minutes to earn their third straight win, and their first ever road win over the Eagles. It was John Harbaugh's 2nd return to Philadelphia.

==== Week 8: Pittsburgh Steelers 28, Baltimore Ravens 24 ====
Week 8: Pittsburgh Steelers at Baltimore Ravens – Game summary

Quarter	1	2	3	4	Total
**Steelers**	7	0	14	7	**28**
Ravens	7	10	0	7	**24**

at M&T Bank Stadium, Baltimore, Maryland

- Date: November 1
- Game time: 1:00 p.m. EST
- Game weather: Cloudy, 52 °F (11 °C)
- Game attendance: 4,345
- Referee: Brad Allen
- TV announcers (CBS): Jim Nantz, Tony Romo, and Tracy Wolfson
- Recap, Game Book

Game information

**First quarter**

- PIT – Robert Spillane 33-yard interception return (Chris Boswell kick), 14:06. Steelers 7–0.
- BAL – Miles Boykin 6-yard pass from Lamar Jackson (Justin Tucker kick), 8:44. Tied 7–7. **Drive: 9 plays, 75 yards, 5:22.**

**Second quarter**

- BAL – Gus Edwards 1-yard run (Justin Tucker kick), 7:24. Ravens 14–7. **Drive: 9 plays, 80 yards, 5:18.**
- BAL – Justin Tucker 51-yard field goal, 0:00. Ravens 17–7. **Drive: 15 plays, 59 yards, 3:44.**

**Third quarter**

- PIT– Eric Ebron 18-yard pass from Ben Roethlisberger (Chris Boswell kick), 13:21. Ravens 17–14. **Drive: 2 plays, 21 yards, 0:43.**
- PIT – James Conner 1-yard run (Chris Boswell kick), 5:38. Steelers 21–17. **Drive: 10 plays, 77 yards, 6:10.**

**Fourth quarter**

- BAL – Marquise Brown 3-yard pass from Lamar Jackson (Justin Tucker kick), 11:56. Ravens 24–21. **Drive: 8 plays, 53 yards, 3:58.**
- PIT– Chase Claypool 8-yard pass from Ben Roethlisberger (Chris Boswell kick), 7:29. Steelers 28–24. **Drive: 8 plays, 80 yards, 4:27.**

**Top passers**

- PIT – Ben Roethlisberger – 21/32, 182 yards, 2 TD
- BAL – Lamar Jackson – 13/28, 208 yards, 2 TD, 2 INT

**Top rushers**

- PIT – James Conner – 15 rushes, 47 yards
- BAL – J. K. Dobbins – 15 rushes, 113 yards

**Top receivers**

- PIT – JuJu Smith-Schuster – 7 receptions, 67 yards
- BAL – Willie Snead – 5 receptions, 106 yards

With the loss, the Ravens fell to 5–2 and lost to the Steelers for the first time since week 9 of the 2018 season. It was also Jackson's first career loss to the Steelers since taking over as starter.

==== Week 9: Baltimore Ravens 24, Indianapolis Colts 10 ====
Week 9: Baltimore Ravens at Indianapolis Colts – Game summary

Quarter	1	2	3	4	Total
**Ravens**	7	0	7	10	**24**
Colts	7	3	0	0	**10**

at Lucas Oil Stadium, Indianapolis, Indiana

- Date: November 8
- Game time: 1:00 p.m. EST
- Game weather: Sunny, 76 °F (24 °C) (retractable roof open)
- Game attendance: 12,200
- Referee: Adrian Hill
- TV announcers (CBS): Ian Eagle, Charles Davis and Evan Washburn
- Recap, Game Book

Game information

**First quarter**

- IND – Jonathan Taylor 1-yard run (Rodrigo Blankenship kick), 5:33. Colts 7–0. **Drive:8 plays, 65 yards, 4:41.**
- BAL – Chuck Clark 65-yard fumble return (Justin Tucker kick), 1:11. Tied 7–7.

**Second quarter**

- IND – Rodrigo Blankenship 43-yard field goal, 0:45. Colts 10–7. **Drive: 11 plays, 68 yards, 4:38.**

**Third quarter**

- BAL – Gus Edwards 1-yard run (Justin Tucker kick), 5:43. Ravens 14–10. **Drive:10 plays, 54 yards, 5:15.**

**Fourth quarter**

- BAL – Lamar Jackson 9-yard run (Justin Tucker kick), 11:08. Ravens 21–10. **Drive: 14 plays, 75 yards, 8:23.**
- IND – Justin Tucker 48-yard field goal, 2:08. Ravens 24–10. **Drive: 4 plays, 6 yards, 2:12.**

**Top passers**

- BAL – Lamar Jackson – 19/23, 170 yards
- IND – Philip Rivers – 26/44, 227 yards, INT

**Top rushers**

- BAL – Lamar Jackson – 13 rushes, 58 yards, TD
- IND – Jordan Wilkins – 11 rushes, 39 yards

**Top receivers**

- BAL – Nick Boyle – 4 receptions, 46 yards
- IND – Michael Pittman Jr. – 4 receptions, 56 yards

After losing a tough game at home to the Steelers the previous week, the Ravens looked to bounce back against the Colts. The Ravens offense was limited to 55 yards of total offense in the first half, the fewest since Lamar Jackson took over as the Ravens quarterback in 2018, and trailed the Colts 10–7 going into halftime. In the second half, the Ravens scored 17 unanswered points while the defense forced a turnover, a punt and 2 turnover on downs against the Colts. With the win, the Ravens improved to 6–2. This was also the franchise's first ever road win in Indianapolis.

==== Week 10: New England Patriots 23, Baltimore Ravens 17 ====
Week 10: Baltimore Ravens at New England Patriots – Game summary

Quarter	1	2	3	4	Total
Ravens	0	10	7	0	**17**
**Patriots**	0	13	10	0	**23**

at Gillette Stadium, Foxborough, Massachusetts

- Date: November 15
- Game time: 8:20 p.m. EST
- Game weather: Rain, 52 °F (11 °C)
- Game attendance: 0
- Referee: Shawn Hochuli
- TV announcers (NBC): Al Michaels, Cris Collinsworth, and Michele Tafoya
- Recap, Game Book

Game information

**First quarter**

- No scoring plays.

**Second quarter**

- BAL – Willie Snead 6-yard pass from Lamar Jackson (Justin Tucker kick), 14:54. Ravens 7–0. **Drive: 13 plays, 94 yards, 8:04.**
- NE – Rex Burkhead 7-yard pass from Cam Newton (Nick Folk kick), 11:46. Tied 7–7. **Drive: 7 plays, 75 yards, 3:08.**
- BAL – Justin Tucker 24-yard field goal, 5:32. Ravens 10–7. **Drive: 11 plays, 69 yards, 6:14.**
- NE – Rex Burkhead 24-yard pass from Jakobi Meyers (kick failed, wide left), 1:02. Patriots 13–10. **Drive: 10 plays, 75 yards, 4:30.**

**Third quarter**

- NE – Cam Newton 4-yard run (Nick Folk kick), 13:17. Patriots 20–10. **Drive: 4 plays, 75 yards, 1:43.**
- NE – Nick Folk 20-yard field goal, 6:24. Patriots 23–10. **Drive: 7 plays, 35 yards, 3:16.**
- BAL – Willie Snead 18-yard pass from Lamar Jackson (Justin Tucker kick), 0:08. Patriots 23–17. **Drive: 11 plays, 75 yards, 6:16.**

**Fourth quarter**

- No scoring plays.

**Top passers**

- BAL – Lamar Jackson – 24/34, 249 yards, 2 TD, INT
- NE – Cam Newton – 13/17, 118 yards, TD

**Top rushers**

- BAL – Lamar Jackson – 11 rushes, 55 yards
- NE – Damien Harris – 22 rushes, 121 yards

**Top receivers**

- BAL – Jakobi Meyers – 5 receptions, 59 yards
- NE – Willie Snead – 5 receptions, 64 yards, 2 TD

With the upset loss, the Ravens dropped to 6–3 and ended their record streak for most consecutive regular season games scoring at least 20 points, at 31.

==== Week 11: Tennessee Titans 30, Baltimore Ravens 24 (OT) ====
Week 11: Tennessee Titans at Baltimore Ravens – Game summary

Quarter	1	2	3	4	OT	Total
**Titans**	7	3	3	11	6	**30**
Ravens	3	11	7	3	0	**24**

at M&T Bank Stadium, Baltimore, Maryland

- Date: November 22
- Game time: 1:00 p.m. EST
- Game weather: Cloudy, 53 °F (12 °C)
- Game attendance: 0
- Referee: Alex Kemp
- TV announcers (CBS): Jim Nantz, Tony Romo, and Tracy Wolfson
- Recap, Game Book

Game information

**First quarter**

- TEN – Jonnu Smith 1-yard pass from Ryan Tannehill (Stephen Gostkowski kick), 8:37. Titans 7–0. **Drive: 9 plays, 79 yards, 5:16.**
- BAL – Justin Tucker 30-yard field goal, 1:50. Titans 7–3. **Drive: 13 plays, 63 yards, 6:47.**

**Second quarter**

- BAL – Justin Tucker 27-yard field goal, 11:05. Titans 7–6. **Drive: 7 plays, 13 yards, 3:03.**
- BAL – J. K. Dobbins 2-yard run (Lamar Jackson–J. K. Dobbins pass), 5:17. Ravens 14–7. **Drive: 9 plays, 60 yards, 4:08.**
- TEN – Stephen Gostkowski 40-yard field goal, 0:48. Ravens 14–10. **Drive: 14 plays, 53 yards, 4:29.**

**Third quarter**

- BAL – Mark Andrews 31-yard pass from Lamar Jackson (Justin Tucker kick), 9:34. Ravens 21–10. **Drive: 7 plays, 74 yards, 3:52.**
- TEN – Stephen Gostkowski 40-yard field goal, 5:33. Ravens 21–13. **Drive: 8 plays, 53 yards, 4:01.**

**Fourth quarter**

- TEN – Stephen Gostkowski 22-yard field goal, 11:12. Ravens 21–16. **Drive: 12 plays, 81 yards, 5:34.**
- TEN – A. J. Brown 14-yard pass from Ryan Tannehill (Ryan Tannehill rush), 2:18. Titans 24–21. **Drive: 10 plays, 90 yards, 5:25.**
- BAL – Justin Tucker 29-yard field goal, 0:15. Tied 24–24. **Drive: 9 plays, 65 yards, 2:03.**

**Overtime**

- TEN – Derrick Henry 29-yard run, 5:21. Titans 30–24. **Drive: 6 plays, 73 yards, 2:37.**

**Top passers**

- TEN – Ryan Tannehill – 22/31, 259 yards, 2 TD, INT
- BAL – Lamar Jackson – 17/29, 186 yards, TD, INT

**Top rushers**

- TEN – Derrick Henry – 28 rushes, 133 yards, TD
- BAL – J. K. Dobbins – 15 rushes, 70 yards, TD

**Top receivers**

- TEN – Corey Davis – 5 receptions, 113 yards
- BAL – Mark Andrews – 5 receptions, 96 yards, TD

==== Week 12: Pittsburgh Steelers 19, Baltimore Ravens 14 ====
Week 12: Baltimore Ravens at Pittsburgh Steelers – Game summary

Quarter	1	2	3	4	Total
Ravens	7	0	0	7	**14**
**Steelers**	6	6	0	7	**19**

at Heinz Field, Pittsburgh, Pennsylvania

- Date: December 2
- Game time: 3:40 p.m. EST
- Game weather: Sunny, 37 °F (3 °C)
- Game attendance: 0
- Referee: Ronald Torbert
- TV announcers (NBC): Mike Tirico, Cris Collinsworth, and Michele Tafoya
- Recap, Game Book

Game information

**First quarter**

- PIT – Joe Haden 14-yard interception return (kick failed), 6:57. Steelers 6–0.
- BAL – Gus Edwards 1-yard run (Justin Tucker kick), 5:17. Ravens 7–6. **Drive: 4 plays, 16 yards, 2:24.**

**Second quarter**

- PIT – Chris Boswell 25-yard field goal, 11:50. Steelers 9–7 . **Drive: 12 plays, 73 yards, 5:17.**
- PIT – Chris Boswell 27-yard field goal, 4:27. Steelers 12–7 . **Drive: 13 plays, 65 yards, 5:14.**

**Third quarter**

- No scoring plays.

**Fourth quarter**

- PIT– Ben Roethlisberger 1-yard pass from JuJu Smith-Schuster (Chris Boswell kick), 13:20. Steelers 19–7. **Drive: 12 plays, 61 yards, 4:52.**
- BAL – Marquise Brown 70-yard pass from Trace McSorley (Justin Tucker kick), 2:58. Steelers 19–14. **Drive: 2 plays, 84 yards, 0:32.**

**Top passers**

- BAL – Trace McSorley – 2/6, 77 yards, TD
- PIT – Ben Roethlisberger – 36/51, 266 yards, TD, INT

**Top rushers**

- BAL – Robert Griffin III – 7 rushes, 68 yards
- PIT – Benny Snell – 16 rushes, 60 yards

**Top receivers**

- BAL – Marquise Brown – 4 receptions, 85 yards, TD
- PIT – Eric Ebron – 7 receptions, 54 yards

Although it was originally scheduled for Thanksgiving night, a COVID-19 outbreak with the Ravens organization caused the game to be postpone three times. 18 players were out for the Ravens, including QB Lamar Jackson, RBs Mark Ingram II and J. K. Dobbins, FB Patrick Ricard, TE Mark Andrews, WR Willie Snead, DE Calais Campbell, and NT Brandon Williams. With the loss, the Ravens fell to 6–5 and were eliminated from AFC North contention. They would be swept by the Steelers for the first time since 2017.

==== Week 13: Baltimore Ravens 34, Dallas Cowboys 17 ====
Week 13: Dallas Cowboys at Baltimore Ravens – Game summary

Quarter	1	2	3	4	Total
Cowboys	3	7	0	7	**17**
**Ravens**	7	10	7	10	**34**

at M&T Bank Stadium, Baltimore, Maryland

- Date: December 8
- Game time: 8:05 p.m. EST
- Game weather: Clear, 38 °F (3 °C)
- Game attendance: 0
- Referee: Brad Allen
- TV announcers (Fox/NFLN/Amazon Prime Video): Joe Buck, Troy Aikman, Erin Andrews, and Kristina Pink
- Recap, Game Book

Game information

**First quarter**

- DAL – Greg Zuerlein 31-yard field goal, 4:21. Cowboys 3–0 . **Drive: 6 plays, 21 yards, 2:42.**
- BAL – Lamar Jackson 37-yard run (Justin Tucker kick), 0:25. Ravens 7–3. **Drive: 7 plays, 75 yards, 3:56.**

**Second quarter**

- DAL – Michael Gallup 13-yard pass from Andy Dalton (Greg Zuerlein kick), 14:19. Cowboys 10–7. **Drive: 3 plays, 28 yards, 1:06.**
- BAL – Miles Boykin 38-yard pass from Lamar Jackson (Justin Tucker kick), 8:08. Ravens 14–10. **Drive: 1 play, 38 yards, 0:07.**
- BAL – Justin Tucker 35-yard field goal, 0:46. Ravens 17–10 . **Drive: 6 plays, 53 yards, 1:16.**

**Third quarter**

- BAL – Marquise Brown 20-yard pass from Lamar Jackson (Justin Tucker kick), 4:40. Ravens 24–10. **Drive: 9 plays, 57 yards, 4:27.**

**Fourth quarter**

- BAL – Justin Tucker 22-yard field goal, 8:15. Ravens 27–10 . **Drive: 11 plays, 54 yards, 5:59.**
- DAL – Amari Cooper 2-yard pass from Andy Dalton (Greg Zuerlein kick), 3:49. Ravens 27–17. **Drive: 12 plays, 75 yards, 4:16.**
- BAL – J. K. Dobbins 5-yard run (Justin Tucker kick), 2:08. Ravens 34–17. **Drive: 6 plays, 44 yards, 1:51.**

**Top passers**

- DAL – Andy Dalton – 31/48, 285 yards, 2 TD, INT
- BAL – Lamar Jackson – 12/17, 107 yards, 2 TD, INT

**Top rushers**

- DAL – Ezekiel Elliott – 18 rushes, 77 yards
- BAL – Gus Edwards – 7 rushes, 101 yards

**Top receivers**

- DAL – Michael Gallup – 7 receptions, 86 yards, TD
- BAL – Marquise Brown – 5 receptions, 39 yards, TD

Most of the Ravens starters, including Lamar Jackson, returned as Ravens defeated the Cowboys. The Ravens as a team rushed for 294 yards and two touchdowns, while Jackson added 107 yards passing and two more touchdowns. The game would have also pitted WR Dez Bryant against his former team, but a positive COVID-19 test right before the game caused him to be held out.

==== Week 14: Baltimore Ravens 47, Cleveland Browns 42 ====
Week 14: Baltimore Ravens at Cleveland Browns – Game summary

Quarter	1	2	3	4	Total
**Ravens**	7	14	13	13	**47**
Browns	7	7	6	22	**42**

at FirstEnergy Stadium, Cleveland, Ohio

- Date: December 14
- Game time: 8:15 p.m. EST
- Game weather: Cloudy, 34 °F (1 °C)
- Game attendance: 11,974
- Referee: Bill Vinovich
- TV announcers (ESPN): Steve Levy, Brian Griese, Louis Riddick, and Lisa Salters
- Recap, Game Book

Game information

**First quarter**

- CLE – Nick Chubb 7-yard run (Cody Parkey kick), 9:06. Browns 7–0. **Drive: 11 plays, 81 yards, 5:54.**
- BAL – Lamar Jackson 5-yard run (Justin Tucker kick), 3:04. Tied 7–7. **Drive: 9 plays, 73 yards, 6:02.**

**Second quarter**

- BAL – Gus Edwards 11-yard run (Justin Tucker kick), 7:49. Ravens 14–7. **Drive: 8 plays, 80 yards, 4:41.**
- CLE – Nick Chubb 14-yard run (Cody Parkey kick), 4:16. Tied 14–14. **Drive: 7 plays, 75 yards, 3:33.**
- BAL – Lamar Jackson 17-yard run (Justin Tucker kick), 0:30. Ravens 21–14. **Drive: 4 plays, 56 yards, 0:31.**

**Third quarter**

- BAL – Gus Edwards 19-yard run (Justin Tucker kick), 12:47. Ravens 28–14. **Drive: 4 plays, 75 yards, 2:13.**
- CLE – Kareem Hunt 5-yard run (kick failed), 9:06. Ravens 28–20. **Drive: 11 plays, 75 yards, 3:41.**
- BAL – J. K. Dobbins 1-yard run (kick blocked), 4:21. Ravens 34–20. **Drive: 1 play, 1 yard, 0:03.**

**Fourth quarter**

- CLE – Rashard Higgins 21-yard pass from Baker Mayfield (Baker Mayfield–Donovan Peoples-Jones pass), 13:36. Ravens 34–28. **Drive: 12 plays, 75 yards, 5:45.**
- CLE – Baker Mayfield 5-yard run (Cody Parkey kick), 6:33. Browns 35–34. **Drive: 12 plays, 70 yards, 6:13.**
- BAL – Marquise Brown 44-yard pass from Lamar Jackson (J. K. Dobbins run), 1:51. Ravens 42–35. **Drive: 9 plays, 79 yards, 4:42.**
- CLE – Kareem Hunt 22-yard pass from Baker Mayfield (Cody Parkey kick), 1:04. Tied 42–42. **Drive: 4 plays, 75 yards, 0:47.**
- BAL – Justin Tucker 55-yard field goal, 0:02. Ravens 45–42 . **Drive: 6 plays, 38 yards, 1:02.**
- BAL – Jarvis Landry pushed out-of-bounds in endzone by Marlon Humphrey for a safety, 0:00. Ravens 47–42.

**Top passers**

- BAL – Lamar Jackson – 11/17, 163 yards, TD
- CLE – Baker Mayfield – 28/47, 343 yards, 2 TDS, INT

**Top rushers**

- BAL – Lamar Jackson – 9 rushes, 124 yards, 2 TDS
- CLE – Nick Chubb – 17 rushes, 82 yards, 2 TDS

**Top receivers**

- BAL – Mark Andrews – 5 receptions, 78 yards
- CLE – Kareem Hunt – 6 receptions, 77 yards, TD

In the highest scoring game in the history of the Browns–Ravens rivalry, as well as in the 2020 NFL season, Lamar Jackson rushed for two touchdowns but left the game for a short time in the fourth quarter with "cramps", allowing the Browns to rally from a 34–20 deficit to take a 35–34 lead. Backup Trace McSorley was forced into the game as a result, but left with a knee injury at the two-minute warning. Jackson then came back out and threw a 44-yard touchdown pass to Marquise Brown on 4th and 5, putting the Ravens back in front, 42–35. After Cleveland quickly drove down the field and tied the game, Jackson led the Ravens on a short drive that got them into field goal range, where Justin Tucker booted a 55-yard field goal with two seconds remaining to win the game for the Ravens. A safety on the Browns' final play capped the wild finish and brought the final score to 47–42.

==== Week 15: Baltimore Ravens 40, Jacksonville Jaguars 14 ====
Week 15: Jacksonville Jaguars at Baltimore Ravens – Game summary

Quarter	1	2	3	4	Total
Jaguars	0	0	7	7	**14**
**Ravens**	9	17	7	7	**40**

at M&T Bank Stadium, Baltimore, Maryland

- Date: December 20
- Game time: 1:00 p.m. EST
- Game weather: Mostly cloudy, 39 °F (4 °C)
- Game attendance: 0
- Referee: Ronald Torbert
- TV announcers (CBS): Andrew Catalon, James Lofton, and Sherree Burruss
- Recap, Game Book

Game information

**First quarter**

- BAL – Gardner Minshew sacked in the endzone by Matthew Judon for a safety, 10:57. Ravens 2–0.
- BAL – Miles Boykin 4-yard pass from Lamar Jackson (Justin Tucker kick), 6:35. Ravens 9–0. **Drive: 7 play, 68 yards, 4:22.**

**Second quarter**

- BAL – J. K. Dobbins 2-yard run (Justin Tucker kick), 14:14. Ravens 16–0. **Drive: 6 plays, 49 yards, 2:36.**
- BAL – Justin Tucker 46-yard field goal, 7:44. Ravens 19–0 . **Drive: 6 plays, 41 yards, 2:59.**
- BAL – Dez Bryant 11-yard pass from Lamar Jackson (Justin Tucker kick), 1:20. Ravens 26–0. **Drive: 8 play, 57 yards, 1:56.**

**Third quarter**

- JAX – James Robinson 17-yard pass from Gardner Minshew (Aldrick Rosas kick), 9:09. Ravens 26–7. **Drive: 10 play, 75 yards, 5:51.**
- BAL – Lamar Jackson 5-yard run (Justin Tucker kick), 4:35. Ravens 33–7. **Drive: 10 plays, 75 yards, 4:34.**

**Fourth quarter**

- BAL – Mark Andrews 3-yard pass from Lamar Jackson (Justin Tucker kick), 9:46. Ravens 40–7. **Drive: 10 play, 86 yards, 5:50.**
- JAX – Chris Conley 13-yard pass from Gardner Minshew (Aldrick Rosas kick), 1:44. Ravens 40–14. **Drive: 6 play, 66 yards, 2:11.**

**Top passers**

- JAX – Gardner Minshew – 22/29, 226 yards, 2 TD
- BAL – Lamar Jackson – 17/22, 243 yards, 3 TD, INT

**Top rushers**

- JAX – James Robinson – 16 rushes, 35 yards
- BAL – J. K. Dobbins – 13 rushes, 64 yards, TD

**Top receivers**

- JAX – D. J. Chark – 4 receptions, 53 yards
- BAL – Marquise Brown – 6 receptions, 98 yards

After a thrilling shootout win the week prior, the Ravens routed the Jaguars in Week 14 to keep their playoff hopes alive. Lamar Jackson threw for 243 yards with three touchdowns and an interception while also adding 35 yards and a touchdown on the ground. Jackson second touchdown throw was an 11-yard pass to WR Dez Bryant late in the second quarter. It was Bryant's first touchdown since Week 14 of the 2017 season. It also marked the first time since Week 13 of that same season that he along with Larry Fitzgerald and Antonio Brown all caught touchdown passes in the same week.

==== Week 16: Baltimore Ravens 27, New York Giants 13 ====
Week 16: New York Giants at Baltimore Ravens – Game summary

Quarter	1	2	3	4	Total
Giants	0	3	3	7	**13**
**Ravens**	14	6	0	7	**27**

at M&T Bank Stadium, Baltimore, Maryland

- Date: December 27
- Game time: 1:00 p.m. EST
- Game weather: Sunny, 38 °F (3 °C)
- Game attendance: 0
- Referee: John Hussey
- TV announcers (Fox): Kevin Kugler, Brock Huard and Laura Okmin
- Recap, Game Book

Game information

**First quarter**

- BAL – Marquise Brown 6-yard pass from Lamar Jackson (Justin Tucker kick), 6:48. Ravens 7–0. **Drive: 13 play, 82 yards, 8:12.**
- BAL – J. K. Dobbins 2-yard run (Justin Tucker kick), 0:07. Ravens 14–0. **Drive: 10 plays, 65 yards, 5:05.**

**Second quarter**

- BAL – Justin Tucker 20-yard field goal, 4:38. Ravens 17–0 . **Drive: 13 plays, 60 yards, 8:13.**
- NYG – Graham Gano 31-yard field goal, 1:08. Ravens 17–3 . **Drive: 11 plays, 64 yards, 3:30.**
- BAL – Justin Tucker 28-yard field goal, 0:00. Ravens 20–3 . **Drive: 10 plays, 65 yards, 1:08.**

**Third quarter**

- NYG – Graham Gano 42-yard field goal, 3:54. Ravens 20–6 . **Drive: 13 plays, 66 yards, 6:52.**

**Fourth quarter**

- BAL – Dez Bryant 8-yard pass from Lamar Jackson (Justin Tucker kick), 14:55. Ravens 27–6. **Drive: 7 play, 59 yards, 3:59.**
- NYG – Sterling Shepard 3-yard pass from Daniel Jones (Graham Gano kick), 8:40. Ravens 27–13. **Drive: 15 play, 76 yards, 6:15.**

**Top passers**

- NYG – Daniel Jones – 24/41, 252 yards, TD
- BAL – Lamar Jackson – 17/26, 183 yards, 2 TD

**Top rushers**

- NYG – Wayne Gallman – 6 rushes, 27 yards
- BAL – Gus Edwards – 15 rushes, 85 yards

**Top receivers**

- NYG – Sterling Shepard – 9 receptions, 77 yards, TD
- BAL – Mark Andrews – 6 receptions, 76 yards

The Ravens won their fourth straight game behind another dominant running performance as the team rushed for 249 yards. Their win coupled with critical losses by the Cleveland Browns against the New York Jets and the Indianapolis Colts against the division rival Pittsburgh Steelers put the Ravens in a "win and in" playoff scenario against the Cincinnati Bengals in Week 17.

==== Week 17: Baltimore Ravens 38, Cincinnati Bengals 3 ====
Week 17: Baltimore Ravens at Cincinnati Bengals – Game summary

Quarter	1	2	3	4	Total
**Ravens**	10	7	21	0	**38**
Bengals	0	3	0	0	**3**

at Paul Brown Stadium, Cincinnati, Ohio

- Date: January 3
- Game time: 1:00 p.m. EST
- Game weather: Cloudy, 39 °F (4 °C)
- Game attendance: 10,499
- Referee: Land Clark
- TV announcers (CBS): Spero Dedes, Adam Archuleta
- Recap, Game Book

Game information

**First quarter**

- BAL – Justin Tucker 34-yard field goal, 8:08. Ravens 3–0. **Drive: 12 plays, 59 yards, 6:52.**
- BAL – Miles Boykin 43-yard pass from Lamar Jackson (Justin Tucker kick), 3:48. Ravens 10–0. **Drive: 6 plays, 69 yards, 2:52.**

**Second quarter**

- BAL – Marquise Brown 18-yard pass from Lamar Jackson (Justin Tucker kick), 4:26. Ravens 17–0. **Drive: 17 plays, 93 yards, 8:39.**
- CIN – Austin Seibert 38-yard field goal, 0:32. Ravens 17–3. **Drive: 8 plays, 55 yards, 3:54.**

**Third quarter**

- BAL – J. K. Dobbins 4-yard run (Justin Tucker kick), 9:55. Ravens 24–3. **Drive: 5 plays, 70 yards, 2:40.**
- BAL – Marquise Brown 9-yard pass from Lamar Jackson (Justin Tucker kick), 3:44. Ravens 31–3. **Drive: 10 plays, 50 yards, 5:10.**
- BAL – J. K. Dobbins 72-yard run (Justin Tucker kick), 1:45. Ravens 38–3. **Drive: 2 plays, 80 yards, 0:53.**

**Fourth quarter**

- No scoring plays.

**Top passers**

- BAL – Lamar Jackson – 10/18, 113 yards, 3 TD, INT
- CIN – Brandon Allen – 6/21, 48 yards, 2 INT

**Top rushers**

- BAL – J. K. Dobbins – 13 rushes, 160 yards, 2 TD
- CIN – Trayveon Williams – 4 rushes, 74 yards

**Top receivers**

- BAL – Miles Boykin – 1 reception, 43 yards, TD
- CIN – Cethan Carter – 1 reception, 21 yards

Needing a win to clinch a playoff berth, the Ravens rushed for a club-record 404 yards — the fourth team since 1950 to rush for more than 400 in a single game — and Lamar Jackson became the first quarterback to rush for over 1,000 yards in more than one season as the Ravens routed the Bengals for their fifth straight victory. The Week 17 win secured the Ravens' third straight playoff run under Jackson.

=== Standings ===
==== Division ====
AFC North
	W	L	T	PCT	DIV	CONF	PF	PA	STK
^{(3)} Pittsburgh Steelers	12	4	0	.750	4–2	9–3	416	312	L1
^{(5)} Baltimore Ravens	11	5	0	.688	4–2	7–5	468	303	W5
^{(6)} Cleveland Browns	11	5	0	.688	3–3	7–5	408	419	W1
Cincinnati Bengals	4	11	1	.281	1–5	4–8	311	424	L1

==== Conference ====
AFC
#	Team	Division	W	L	T	PCT	DIV	CONF	SOS	SOV	STK
**Division leaders**
1	Kansas City Chiefs	West	14	2	0	.875	4–2	10–2	.465	.464	L1
2	Buffalo Bills	East	13	3	0	.813	6–0	10–2	.512	.471	W6
3	Pittsburgh Steelers	North	12	4	0	.750	4–2	9–3	.475	.448	L1
4 (Note: Tennessee finished ahead of Indianapolis in the AFC South based on division record.)	Tennessee Titans	South	11	5	0	.688	5–1	8–4	.475	.398	W1
**Wild cards**
5 (Note: Baltimore claimed the No. 5 seed over Indianapolis based on head-to-head victory. Division tiebreaker used to eliminate Cleveland (see below).) (Note: Baltimore claimed the No. 5 seed over Cleveland based on head-to-head sweep.)	Baltimore Ravens	North	11	5	0	.688	4–2	7–5	.494	.401	W5
6 (Note: Cleveland claimed the No. 6 seed over Indianapolis based on head-to-head victory.)	Cleveland Browns	North	11	5	0	.688	3–3	7–5	.451	.406	W1
7	Indianapolis Colts	South	11	5	0	.688	4–2	7–5	.443	.384	W1
**Did not qualify for the postseason**
8	Miami Dolphins	East	10	6	0	.625	3–3	7–5	.467	.347	L1
9	Las Vegas Raiders	West	8	8	0	.500	4–2	6–6	.539	.477	W1
10 (Note: New England finished ahead of the LA Chargers based on head-to-head victory.)	New England Patriots	East	7	9	0	.438	3–3	6–6	.527	.429	W1
11	Los Angeles Chargers	West	7	9	0	.438	3–3	6–6	.482	.344	W4
12	Denver Broncos	West	5	11	0	.313	1–5	4–8	.566	.388	L3
13	Cincinnati Bengals	North	4	11	1	.281	1–5	4–8	.529	.438	L1
14	Houston Texans	South	4	12	0	.250	2–4	3–9	.541	.219	L5
15	New York Jets	East	2	14	0	.125	0–6	1–11	.594	.656	L1
16	Jacksonville Jaguars	South	1	15	0	.063	1–5	1–11	.549	.688	L15
**Tiebreakers** (Note: When breaking ties for three or more teams under the NFL's rules, they are first broken within divisions, then comparing only the highest ranked remaining team from each division.)

== Postseason ==
=== Schedule ===
Round	Date	Opponent (seed)	Result	Record	Venue	Recap
Wild Card	January 10, 2021	at Tennessee Titans (4)	W 20–13	1–0	Nissan Stadium	Recap
Divisional	January 16, 2021	at Buffalo Bills (2)	L 3–17	1–1	Bills Stadium	Recap

=== Game summaries ===
==== AFC Wild Card Playoffs: at (4) Tennessee Titans ====
AFC Wild Card Playoffs: (5) Baltimore Ravens at (4) Tennessee Titans;– Game summary

Quarter	1	2	3	4	Total
Ravens	0	10	7	3	20
Titans	10	0	0	3	13

at Nissan Stadium, Nashville, Tennessee

- Date: January 10, 2021
- Game time: 1:05 p.m. EST/12:05 p.m. CST
- Game weather: Cloudy, 33 °F (1 °C)
- Game attendance: 14,029
- Referee: Jerome Boger
- TV announcers (ESPN/ABC): Steve Levy, Brian Griese, Louis Riddick and Lisa Salters
- Recap, Game Book

Game information

First quarter

- TEN – A. J. Brown 10-yard pass from Ryan Tannehill (Stephen Gostkowski kick), 5:39. Titans 7–0. Drive: 10 plays, 70 yards, 6:11.
- TEN – Stephen Gostkowski 45-yard field goal, 1:38. Titans 10–0. Drive: 7 plays, 45 yards, 2:42.

Second quarter

- BAL – Justin Tucker 33-yard field goal, 9:59. Titans 10–3. Drive: 12 plays, 60 yards, 6:39.
- BAL – Lamar Jackson 48-yard run (Justin Tucker kick), 2:32. Tied 10–10. Drive: 7 plays, 82 yards, 4:03.

Third quarter

- BAL – J. K. Dobbins 4-yard run (Justin Tucker kick), 9:01. Ravens 17–10. Drive: 10 plays, 77 yards, 5:59.

Fourth quarter

- TEN – Stephen Gostkowski 25-yard field goal, 14:56. Ravens 17–13. Drive: 7 plays, 51 yards, 3:15.
- BAL – Justin Tucker 51-yard field goal, 4:19. Ravens 20–13. Drive: 9 plays, 52 yards, 5:41.

Top passers

- BAL – Lamar Jackson – 17/24, 179 yards, INT
- TEN – Ryan Tannehill – 18/26, 165 yards, TD, INT

Top rushers

- BAL – Lamar Jackson – 16 rushes, 136 yards, TD
- TEN – Derrick Henry – 18 rushes, 40 yards

Top receivers

- BAL – Marquise Brown – 7 reception, 109 yards
- TEN – A. J. Brown – 6 receptions, 83 yards, TD

The Ravens achieved their first playoff win since 2014 and the first for quarterback Lamar Jackson, outscoring the Titans 20–3 after trailing 10–0. It was also Jackson's first win in a game in which he trailed by two. The home team has yet to win in the five playoff games between the two teams. In a game between the two teams with the most rushing yards during the 2020 season,[33] Baltimore came out on top, outgaining the Titans in total yards 401–209, and holding them to just 51 yards on the ground. Tennessee running back Derrick Henry, the NFL's leading rusher in 2020, was held to just 40 yards on 18 carries.[34][35]

Tennessee scored on their second possession with a 10-play, 75-yard drive, featuring a 28-yard completion from Ryan Tannehill to A. J. Brown, before Brown's 10-yard touchdown catch made the score 7–0.[36] Then, on Baltimore's next drive, Malcolm Butler intercepted a pass from Lamar Jackson on the Tennessee 28-yard line. Tannehill went on to complete a 35-yard pass to Anthony Firkser that set up Stephen Gostkowski's 45-yard field goal, giving the Titans a 10first-quarterter lead.[35] Baltimore responded by moving the ball 65 yards in 12 plays, including a 28-yard completion from Jackson to receiver Marquise Brown. Justin Tucker finished the drive with a 33-yard field goal,[35] that made the score 10–3 five minutes into the second quarter. Then, tr a punt by the Titans, the Ravens tied the score at 10–10 with Jackson's 48-yard touchdown run on a 3rd and 9.[35]

Baltimore took a 17–10 lead with their opening drive of the second half, with Jackson completing 4-of-4 passes for 30 yards and rushing four times for 34 yards, on the way to J. K. Dobbins' 4-yard touchdown run.[35] Following a pair of punts, a roughing the passer penalty against Baltimore defensive end Derek Wolfe turned A. J. Brown's 18-yard reception into a 33-yard gain. Tennessee went on to make the score 17–13 with Gostkowski's 25-yard field goal,[35] on the last play of the third quarter. Baltimore responded with a drive to the Titans' 34-yard line, but Tucker missed a 52-yard field goal.[35] The Titans then drove to Baltimore's 40 yard line, but the drive stalled and they punted. The Ravens responded with another scoring drive as Jackson completed 3-of-3 passes for 30 yards and rushed for 14 yards, setting up a successful 51-yard field goal for Tucker, giving the Ravens a 20–13 lead with 4:23 left.[35] Marcus Peters ended Tennessee's next drive with an interception of Tannehill,[35] enabling the Ravens' offense to run out the clock with four running plays, including a 33-yard run from Jackson.

Jackson completed 17-for-24 passes for 179 yards with an interception,[35] and was the game's leading rusher with 16 carries for 136 yards and a touchdown as he recorded his first playoff victory in his career.[35] Marquise Brown was the game's leading receiver with 7 catches for 109 yards. Tannehill finished the day 18-for-26 for 165 yards, a touchdown, and an interception; Tennessee linebacker Harold Landry had 8 tackles, 2 assists, and 2 sacks.

This was the fifth postseason meeting between the Ravens and Titans. The series was split, with the White team winning all four games. The Ravens are the most recent AFC wild-card team to win and play in the divisional round until the Buffalo Bills would pull this off five years later. In contrast, at least one NFC wild card has advanced to the divisional round every season under the 14-team format.

NFC: Ne

==== AFC Divisional Playoffs: at (2) Buffalo Bills ====
AFC Divisional Playoffs: (5) Baltimore Ravens at (2) Buffalo Bills;– Game summary

Quarter	1	2	3	4	Total
Ravens	0	3	0	0	3
Bills	3	0	14	0	17

at Bills Stadium, Orchard Park, New York

- Date: January 16, 2021
- Game time: 8:15 .p.m.. EST
- Game weather: Mostly cloudy, 34 °F (1 °C)
- Game attendance: 6,772
- Referee: Carl Cheffers
- TV announcers (NBC): Al Michaels, Cris Collinsworth and Michele Tafoya
- Recap, Game Book

Game information

First quarter

- BUF – Tyler Bass 28-yard field goal, 2:57. Bills 3–0. Drive: 5 plays, 28 yards, 1:47.

Second quarter

- BAL – Justin Tucker 34-yard field goal, 0:04. Tied 3–3. Drive: 8 plays, 57 yards, 0:59.

Third quarter

- BUF – Stefon Diggs 3-yard pass from Josh Allen (Tyler Bass kick), 2:29. Bills 10–3. Drive: 11 plays, 66 yards, 5:31.
- BUF – Taron Johnson 101-yard interception return (Tyler Bass kick), 0:41. Bills 17–3.

Fourth quarter

- No scoring plays.

Top passers

- BAL – Lamar Jackson – 14/24, 162 yards, INT
- BUF – Josh Allen – 23/37, 206 yards, TD

Top rushers

- BAL – J. K. Dobbins, Gus Edwards – 10 rushes, 42 yards
- BUF – Devin Singletary – 7 rushes, 25 yards

Top receivers

- BAL – Marquise Brown – 4 receptions, 87 yards
- BUF – Stefon Diggs – 8 receptions, 106 yards, TD

The Ravens' season ended with a game in which they scored the fewest points since John Harbaugh became head coach. Lamar Jackson was intercepted in the end zone for a pick-six, then was later knocked out of the game with a concussion. In a game largely controlled by defense,[69] Bills cornerback Taron Johnson's postseason record-tying 101-yard interception return gave Buffalo a two-score lead that the Ravens could not overcome.[70] Windy conditions also played a major role in the game, with each team missing two field goal attempts, and one punt went for just 23 yards.[71]

Baltimore took the opening kickoff and drove 46 yards to the Bills' 23-yard line, but the drive ended there as Justin Tucker hit the uprights on a 41-yard field goal attempt.[72] Both teams had to punt on their next drive, and Sam Koch's 23-yard kick gave the Bills the ball on the Baltimore 38-yard line. From there, they drove 17 yards to take a 3–0 lead on a 28-yard field goal by rookie kicker Tyler Bass.[72] After a Ravens punt, Buffalo drove to the Baltimore 23-yard line, but Bass missed a 43-yard field goal kick with 13:21 left in the half. Baltimore fared no better, as their next drive also ended in a missed field goal, this time with Tucker hitting the uprights again from 46 yards.[72] After three more punts, Baltimore finally managed to get on the board, converting a 30-yard completion from Lamar Jackson to Marquise Brown into a 34-yard field goal by Tucker on the last play of the half.[72]

Buffalo took the second-half kickoff and drove 66 yards in 11 plays, the longest a 20-yard completion from Josh Allen to Stefon Diggs. On the last play, Allen's 3-yard touchdown pass to Diggs gave Buffalo a 10–3 lead.[73] Baltimore seemed primed to respond, as they moved the ball to a 2nd and goal from the Bills' 9-yard line with 58 seconds left in the third quarter. But on the next play, Johnson picked off a pass from Jackson in the end zone and returned it 101 yards for a touchdown, increasing the Bills' lead to 17–3.[74] Jackson suffered a concussion on the next drive and had to leave the game, and was replaced at quarterback by Tyler Huntley.[75] Baltimore had two possessions in the fourth quarter, but each one ended in a turnover on downs, with the second ending at the Buffalo 10-yard-line.

Allen completed 23 of 37 passes for 206 yards and a touchdown, and Diggs had 8 receptions for 106 yards and a touchdown. In addition to his interception, Johnson also had six tackles. Jackson completed 14/24 passes for 162 yards and one interception, while also rushing for 42 yards.

== Individual awards ==
Recipient	Award(s)
Orlando Brown Jr.	Pro Bowler
Calais Campbell	Week 6: AFC Defensive Player of the Week; Pro Bowler
Morgan Cox	Pro Bowler; 1st team All-Pro
Marlon Humphrey	Pro Bowler
Lamar Jackson	Week 1: AFC Offensive Player of the Week; Week 14: AFC Offensive Player of the Week
Matthew Judon	Pro Bowler
Patrick Queen	Week 5: AFC Defensive Player of the Week
Patrick Ricard	Pro Bowler
Justin Tucker	Pro Bowler; 1st team All-Pro
