= Kristian Welch =

American football player (born 1998)

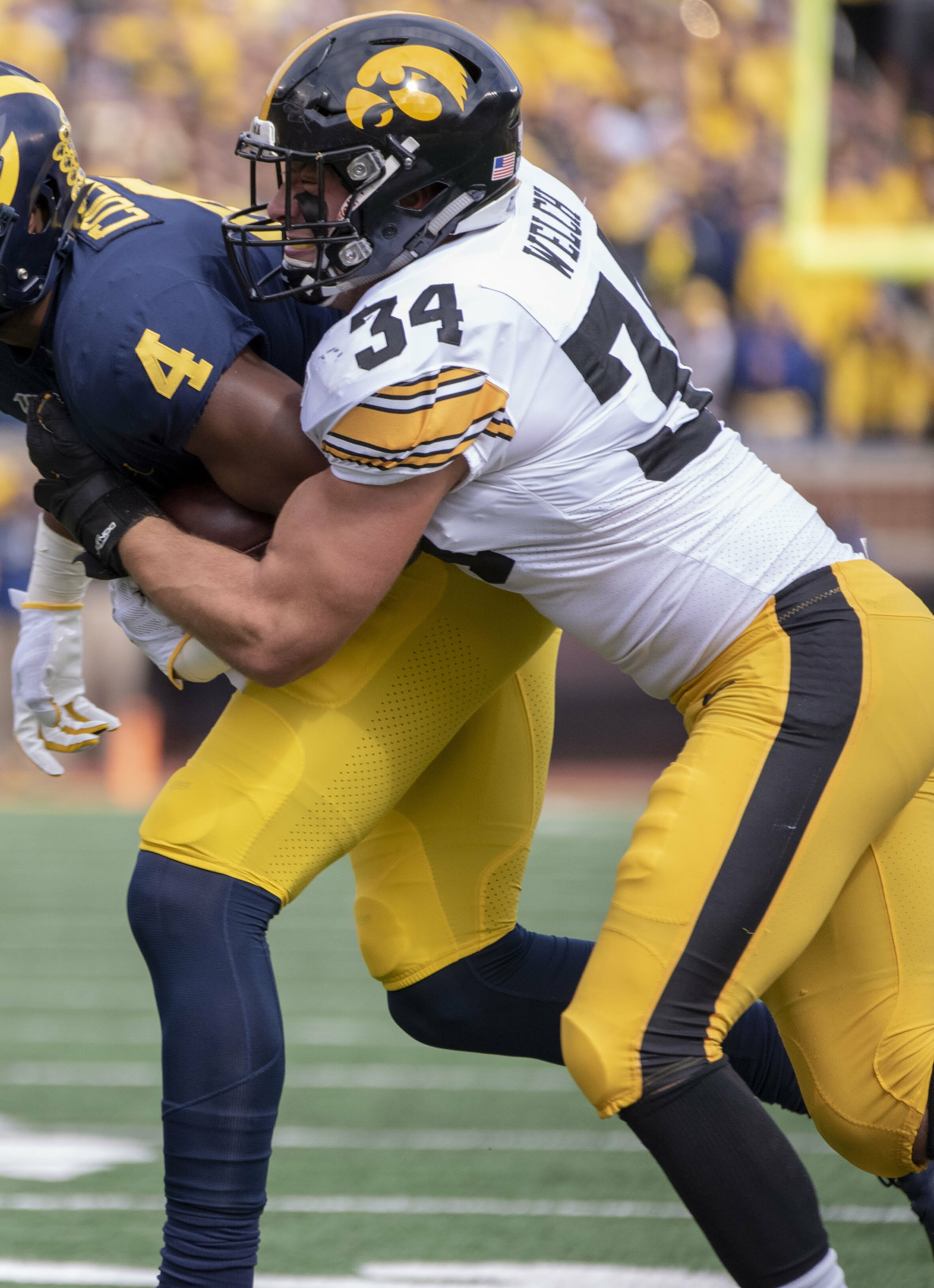
- Welch with the Iowa Hawkeyes in 2019

No. 54 – Green Bay Packers
- Position: Linebacker
- Roster status: Active

Personal information
- Born: May 24, 1998 (age 28); Iola, Wisconsin, U.S.
- Listed height: 6 ft 3 in (1.91 m)
- Listed weight: 240 lb (109 kg)

Career information
- High school: Iola-Scandinavia
- College: Iowa (2016–2019)
- NFL draft: 2020: undrafted

Career history
- Baltimore Ravens (2020–2022); Green Bay Packers (2023); Denver Broncos (2024); Baltimore Ravens (2024); Green Bay Packers (2025–present)

Career NFL statistics as of Week 10, 2026
- Total tackles: 49
- Fumble recoveries: 1
- Stats at Pro Football Reference

Kristian Welch (born May 24, 1998) is an American professional football linebacker for the Green Bay Packers of the National Football League (NFL). He was signed by the Baltimore Ravens as an undrafted free agent in 2020 following his college football career at Iowa. Kristian attended Iola-Scandinavia High School In Iola, Wisconsin.

== Professional career ==
Pre-draft measurables
Height	Weight
6 ft 2 7/8 in (1.90 m)	239 lb (108 kg)
Values from Pro Day

=== Baltimore Ravens ===
Welch signed with the Baltimore Ravens as an undrafted free agent following the 2020 NFL draft on May 6, 2020. He was waived during final roster cuts on September 5, and re-signed to the team's practice squad the next day. He was placed on the practice squad/injured list on September 15, and activated back to the practice squad on October 6, Welch was elevated to the active roster on October 17, and October 31, for the team's Weeks 6 and 8 games against the Philadelphia Eagles and Pittsburgh Steelers, and reverted to the practice squad after each game. He was promoted to the active roster on November 7.

The Ravens placed an exclusive-rights free agent tender on Welch on March 10, 2021. He signed the one-year contract on April 18. In 16 appearances for Baltimore, Welch logged 13 combined tackles.

On March 9, 2022, the Ravens placed an exclusive-rights free agent tender on Welch. Playing in all 17 games for Baltimore, Welch recorded three combined tackles.

On April 8, 2023, Welch re-signed with the Ravens. He was released as part of final roster cuts on August 29.

=== Green Bay Packers ===
Welch was signed to the Green Bay Packers' practice squad on August 31, 2023. He was promoted to the active roster on September 28. In 14 appearances for the Packers, Welch recorded six combined tackles.

Welch was re-signed by the Packers on March 14, 2024. On August 30, 2026, Welch was released by the Packers as part of final roster cuts. A day later, he was signed to the Packers' practice squad.

=== Denver Broncos ===
On August 29, 2024, Welch was signed by the Denver Broncos. On October 15, he was released by the Broncos.

=== Baltimore Ravens (second stint) ===
On October 16, 2024, Welch was signed to the Baltimore Ravens' practice squad. He was promoted to the active roster on November 23.

=== Green Bay Packers (second stint) ===
On March 28, 2025, Welch signed with the Green Bay Packers. He was released on August 26 as part of final roster cuts and signed to the practice squad the next day. Welch was signed to the active roster on November 1, but waived two days later. He was re-signed to the practice squad on November 4. On November 11, Welch was signed to the active roster. In eight total appearances for the Packers, he registered three combined tackles. Welch was placed on season-ending injured reserve due to an ankle injury on December 26.

On August 30, 2026, Welch was released by the Packers as a part of final roster cuts. A day later, he was re–signed to the Packers' practice squad. On September 12, he was elevated to the active roster for week 1. On October 6, Welch was promoted to the active roster.

== NFL career statistics ==
Legend
**Bold**	Career high

=== Regular season ===
Year	Team	GP	GS	Tackles					Interceptions						Fumbles	
Year	Team	GP	GS	Total	Solo	Ast	Sck	SFTY	PDef	Int	Yds	Avg	Lng	TDs	FF	FR
2020	BAL	10	0	5	3	2	0.0	0	0	0	0	0	0	0	0	0
2021	BAL	16	0	**13**	**3**	**10**	0.0	0	0	0	0	0	0	0	0	0
2022	BAL	**17**	0	3	**3**	0	0.0	0	0	0	0	0	0	0	0	0
2023	GB	14	0	6	4	2	0.0	0	0	0	0	0	0	0	0	0
2024	DEN	6	1	8	4	4	0.0	0	0	0	0	0	0	0	0	0
2024	BAL	9	1	5	3	2	0.0	0	0	0	0	0	0	0	0	1
2025	GB	8	0	3	0	3	0.0	0	0	0	0	0	0	0	0	0
Total		80	2	43	20	23	0.0	0	0	0	0	0	0.0	0	0	1
Source: pro-football-reference.com

=== Postseason ===
Year	Team	GP	GS	Tackles					Interceptions						Fumbles	
Year	Team	GP	GS	Total	Solo	Ast	Sck	SFTY	PDef	Int	Yds	Avg	Lng	TDs	FF	FR
2020	BAL	**2**	0	**1**	0	**1**	0.0	0	0	0	0	0.0	0	0	0	0
2023	BAL	1	0	**1**	**1**	0	0.0	0	0	0	0	0.0	0	0	0	0
2023	GB	**2**	0	**1**	**1**	0	0.0	0	0	0	0	0.0	0	0	0	0
2024	BAL	1	0	**1**	0	**1**	0.0	0	0	0	0	0.0	0	0	0	0
Total		6	0	4	2	2	0.0	0	0	0	0	0.0	0	0	0	0
Source: pro-football-reference.com
