= Justin Tucker =

American football player (born 1989)

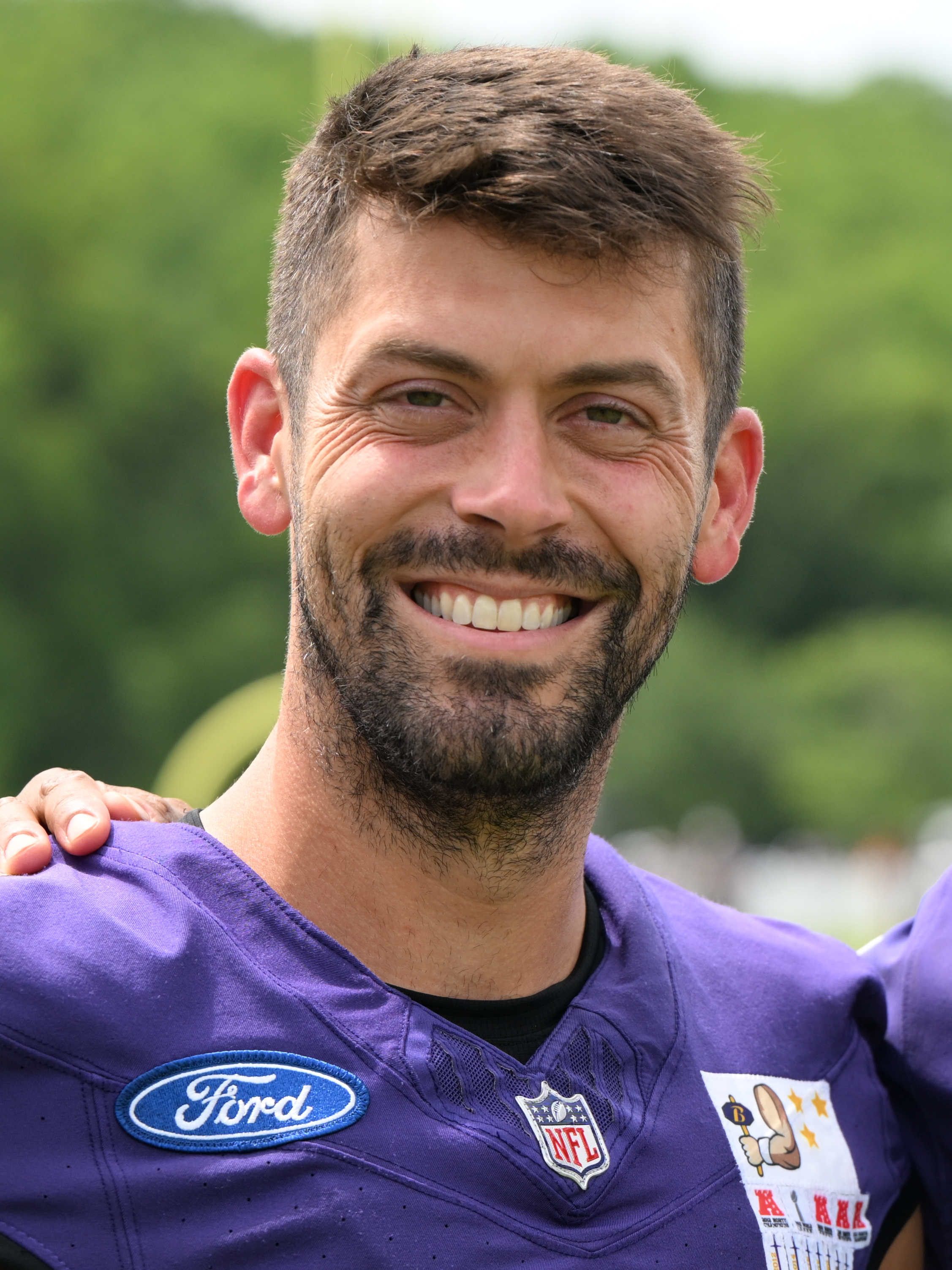
- Tucker with the Baltimore Ravens in 2024

No. 42 – Kansas City Chiefs
- Position: Placekicker
- Roster status: Practice squad

Personal information
- Born: November 21, 1989 (age 36); Houston, Texas, U.S.
- Listed height: 6 ft 1 in (1.85 m)
- Listed weight: 191 lb (87 kg)

Career information
- High school: Westlake (Austin, Texas)
- College: Texas (2008–2011)
- NFL draft: 2012: undrafted

Career history
- Baltimore Ravens (2012–2024); Kansas City Chiefs (2026–present)*
- * Offseason or practice squad member only

Awards and highlights
- Super Bowl champion (XLVII); 5× First-team All-Pro (2013, 2016, 2018, 2019, 2021); 3× Second-team All-Pro (2017, 2020, 2022); 7× Pro Bowl (2013, 2016, 2019–2023); NFL 2010s All-Decade Team; Second-team All-Big 12 (2011)

Career NFL statistics
- Field goals made: 417
- Field goals attempted: 468
- Field goal %: 89.1%
- Extra points made: 524
- Extra points attempted: 532
- Extra point %: 98.5%
- Points: 1,775
- Longest field goal: 66
- Touchbacks: 756
- Stats at Pro Football Reference

Justin Paul Tucker (born November 21, 1989) is an American professional football placekicker for the Kansas City Chiefs of the National Football League (NFL). He played college football for the Texas Longhorns and signed with the Baltimore Ravens as an undrafted free agent in 2012, spending 13 seasons with the team. Regarded as one of the greatest placekickers ever, Tucker previously held the NFL record for longest field goal at 66 yards (Note: Broken by Cam Little in 2025 with a 68–yard field goal.) and is second in career field goal percentage at 89.1%. (Note: Minimum 100 career field goal attempts. Behind only Cameron Dicker (92.6%).) He has also been named to seven Pro Bowls and eight All-Pro teams, including five first-team. He also won Super Bowl XLVII with Baltimore as a rookie.

== Early life ==
Tucker attended Westlake High School in Austin, Texas. At Westlake, he was a teammate of future NFL quarterback Nick Foles, tight end Kyle Adams, and linebacker Bryce Hager. Tucker played wide receiver, safety, and placekicker on the Westlake Chaparrals. He also played soccer from age three or four up until his sophomore year. Tucker played in the 2008 U.S. Army All-American Bowl.

== College career ==
Tucker attended the University of Texas at Austin and played on the Longhorns football team. In 2011, concluding a rivalry that saw Texas A&M University and the University of Texas square off 118 times over 117 years, he kicked the game-winning field goal as time expired. Texas, then ranked No. 25, won 27–25. Although Tucker finished his college football career with an 83.3% field-goal conversion percentage, which was the third-best in the program's history, Tucker was not invited to the East-West Shrine Game, Senior Bowl or the NFL Scouting Combine.

Originally a communications major, Tucker switched to recording technology and studied under Nikita Storojev at the Sarah and Ernest Butler School of Music where he learned to sing operatically in English, Spanish, French, Italian, German, Latin, and Russian. Tucker graduated with a Bachelor of Arts in music a semester early in order to train for the NFL draft.

== Professional career ==
=== Baltimore Ravens ===
==== 2012 ====
To help promote himself for the draft, Tucker shot an uncut and unedited five-minute YouTube video of him making all 10 of his field goal attempts from left, right and center angles and distances ranging from 30 to 55 yards out. At the end, Tucker looked at the camera and said, "Pick me." After not being among the four kickers (Randy Bullock, Greg Zuerlein, Blair Walsh, and John Potter) selected in the 2012 NFL draft, Tucker signed as an undrafted free agent with the Baltimore Ravens on May 29, to begin workouts and camp for the Ravens alongside placekicker Billy Cundiff. After Tucker's preseason performance, he was named the starter and Cundiff was released.

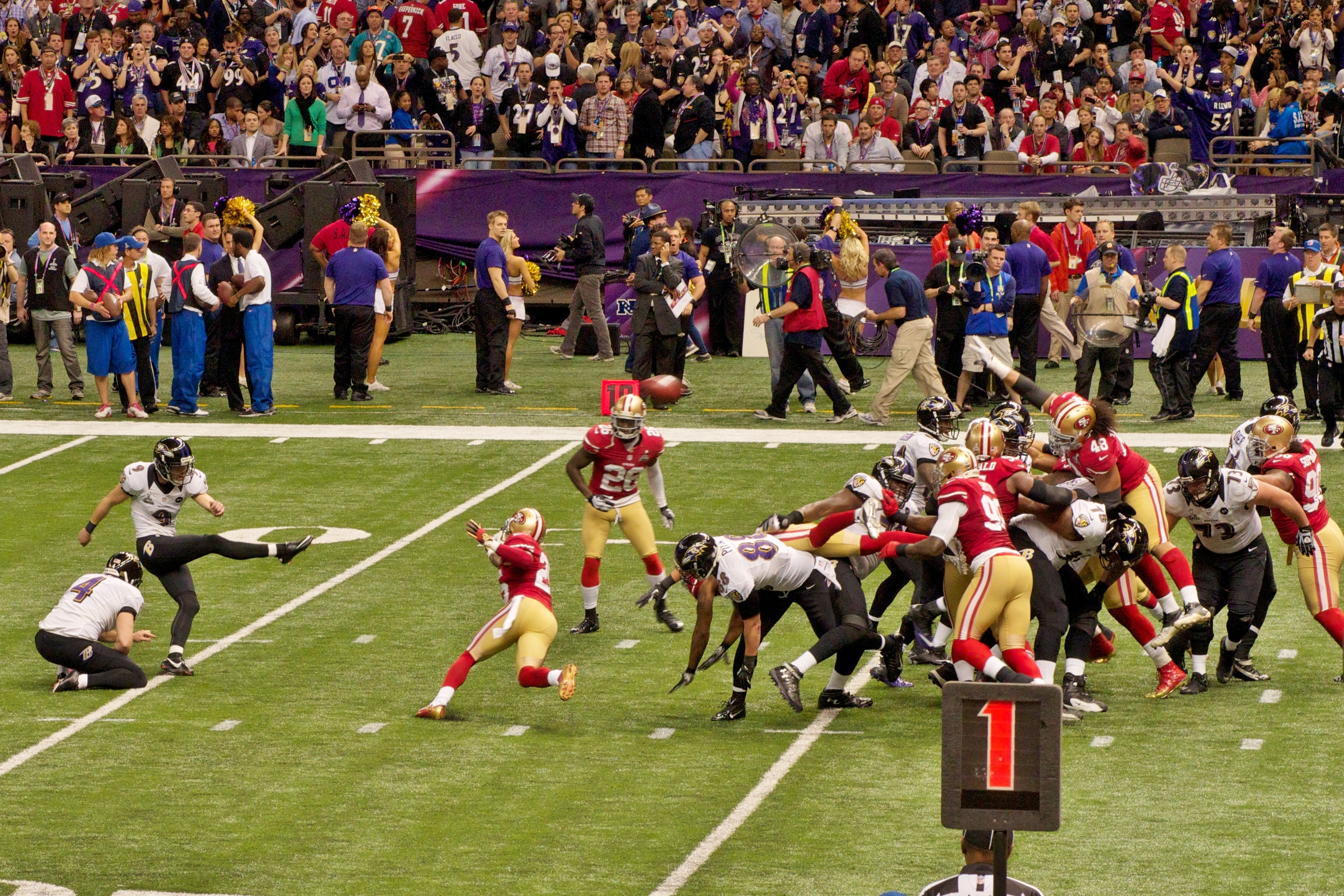
Tucker attempting a field goal in Super Bowl XLVII

In his debut season, Tucker proved to be a very accurate kicker, making all 42 of his extra point attempts and missing only three out of his 33 field goals. During a narrow Week 3 31–30 victory over the New England Patriots, Tucker kicked the game-winning 27-yard field goal. The field goal ended up being a source of controversy because the ball was kicked over the top of the right upright and clear replays showed that the ball was extremely close to sailing wide of the upright. However, the kick was ruled "good" by the replacement referees (the original referees were on strike at the time) and since field goals are not reviewable, the play could not be reviewed, giving Baltimore the victory. In Week 12 against the San Diego Chargers, Tucker kicked the game-tying and game-winning field goal (both from 38 yards) at the end of regulation and in overtime respectively in a 16–13 road victory.

On January 12, 2013, during the Divisional Round against the Denver Broncos, Tucker kicked a 47-yard field goal in double overtime to win the game on the road 38–35 (later known as the Mile High Miracle) and sent the Ravens to the AFC Championship Game for the second consecutive year. During the second quarter of Super Bowl XLVII against the San Francisco 49ers, Tucker failed in completing the first fake field goal attempt in Super Bowl history, coming up just one yard short of the nine needed for the first down. Nonetheless, his two fourth-quarter field goals secured a 34–31 victory for the Ravens, earning Tucker his first Super Bowl ring.

==== 2013 ====
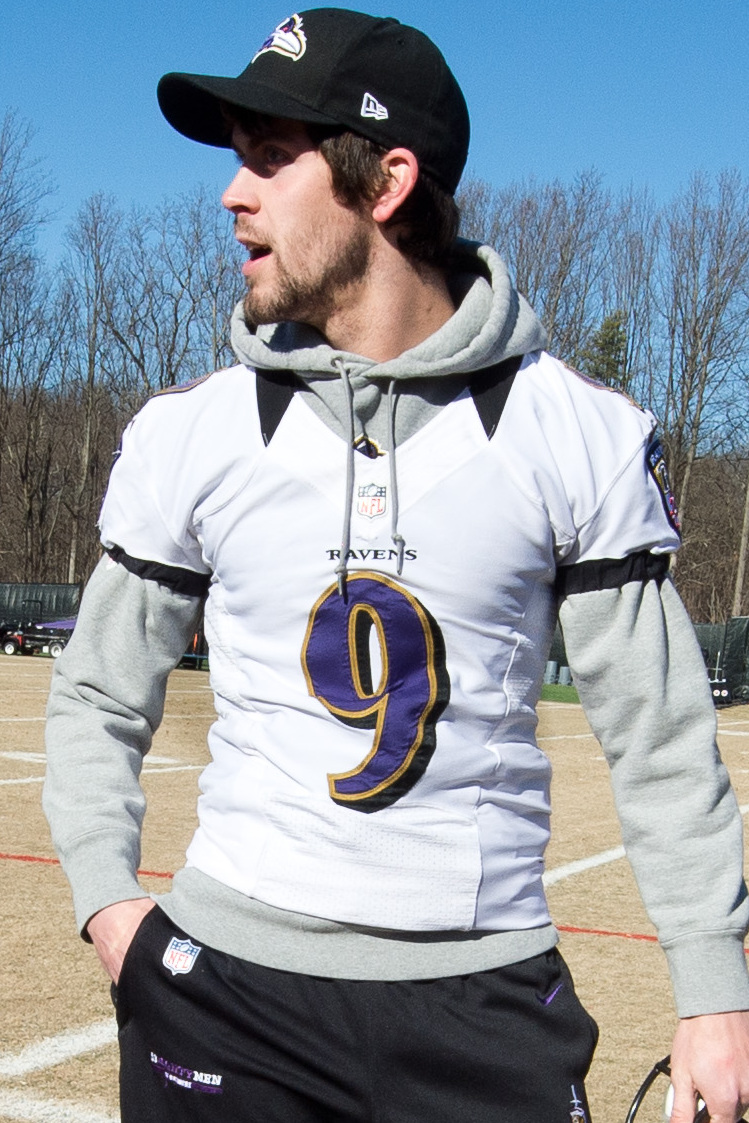
Tucker in 2013

Despite missing two field goals in Week 2 against the Cleveland Browns, Tucker continued his success as an accurate kicker for the Ravens. In Week 5 against the Miami Dolphins, Tucker kicked the go-ahead 44-yard field goal late in the fourth quarter to give the Ravens a 26–23 road victory. He also kicked the game-winning 46-yard field goal in overtime against the Cincinnati Bengals in Week 10, letting the Ravens win 20–17. Tucker was named AFC Special Teams Player of the Month for November. On Thanksgiving, Tucker kicked five field goals en route to a narrow 22–20 victory over the Pittsburgh Steelers. He was also selected as the player of the game along with Jacoby Jones by John Madden. Tucker brought his holder, Sam Koch and long snapper, Morgan Cox, to accept the award on screen with him.

In 2013, Tucker kicked a franchise record-tying six field goals that were the Ravens' only points in a narrow 18–16 victory over the Detroit Lions at Ford Field in Detroit on December 16, including a game-winning 61-yard field goal in the last minute of the game. During the game, Tucker became the first kicker in NFL history to kick a field goal in the 20s, 30s, 40s, 50s, and 60s in the same game. His 61-yard field goal set the NFL record for longest field goal in a domed stadium; Tucker would break his own record almost eight years later in the same stadium. Tucker was named AFC Special Teams Player of the Week thrice: Week 10, Week 12, and Week 15. He finished the year leading the league in field goal attempts and makes, earning his first Pro Bowl selection as well as being voted first team All-Pro by AP voters.

==== 2014 ====
During a narrow Week 3 23–21 road victory over the Browns, Tucker kicked a game-winning 32-yard field goal as time expired. He was named AFC Special Teams Player of the Week for his performance against the Browns. Tucker won AFC Special Teams Player of the Month for November. He finished the year contributing 129 of the then-franchise-record 409 points scored by the Ravens that season. Tucker converted all 42 extra point attempts and 29 of 34 field goal attempts.

==== 2015 ====
Tucker had his worst year statistically in 2015, missing seven field goals despite leading the league in field goal attempts. However, Tucker was also one of the lone bright spots in a season plagued by injuries. In Week 4 against the Steelers, he kicked the game-tying 42-yard and game-winning 52-yard field goals at the end of regulation and in overtime, respectively, during a 23–20 road victory. He had also kicked a 40-yard field goal earlier in the fourth quarter and was named AFC Special Teams Player of the Week for his game against Pittsburgh. In the next game against the Browns, Tucker kicked the game-tying 25-yard field goal late in the fourth quarter, but the Ravens lost in overtime 30–33. During a Week 8 29–26 victory over the Chargers, Tucker made all five of his field goal attempts, including the game-winning 39-yard field goal as time expired. Tucker was named AFC Special Teams Player of the Week for his performance against the Chargers. Three weeks later against the St. Louis Rams, Tucker made the game-tying 20-yard and game-winning 47-yard field goal in the fourth quarter with the latter coming as time expired in the 16–13 victory for the Ravens' third win of the year. However, in Week 13 against the Dolphins, Tucker missed a potential go-ahead 55-yard field goal late in the fourth quarter and the Ravens narrowly lost on the road 13–15. Overall, Tucker converted all 29 extra point attempts and 33 of 40 field goal attempts during the 2015 season.

==== 2016 ====
On February 26, 2016, the Ravens placed the franchise tag on Tucker. He signed the franchise tender eight days later, which would pay him $4.5 million. Tucker signed a four-year, $16.8 million extension on July 15.

Tucker converted a go-ahead field goal during a Week 2 25–20 road victory over the Browns before kicking a game-winning 53-yard field goal late in the fourth quarter of a narrow 19–17 road victory over the Jacksonville Jaguars. He won AFC Special Teams Player of the Month for September. During a Week 12 19–14 victory over the Bengals, Tucker kicked four field goals, three from over 50 yards, earning him AFC Special Teams Player of the Week honors. Three weeks later against Philadelphia Eagles, Tucker tied the NFL single-season record for 10 field goals of more than 50 yards in a narrow 27–26 victory.

Tucker finished the 2016 season, his best statistically, making all but one field goal, which was blocked in Week 14 against the Patriots, leading the league with 38 makes. He was named to his second Pro Bowl, his first since 2013, as a result of his successful season and was named First-team All-Pro for the second time in his career.

==== 2017 ====
Tucker was named AFC Special Teams Player of the Month for November. He converted all eight field attempts in the month. In 2017, Tucker completed 34 of 37 field goals and was a perfect 39-for-39 on extra points. He was named second-team All-Pro for the 2017 season.

==== 2018 ====
During a Week 3 27–14 victory over the Broncos, Tucker made two 50+ yard field goals and three extra points. He was named AFC Special Teams Player of the Week for his performance. Tucker was later named the AFC Special Teams Player of the Month for September. However, during Week 7, Tucker missed his first career extra point attempt against the New Orleans Saints with 24 seconds left in the game, resulting in a narrow 23–24 loss in a game that would have otherwise likely gone to overtime. During a Week 11 24–21 victory over the Bengals, Tucker kicked the go-ahead 24-yard field goal midway through the fourth quarter. In the regular-season finale against the Browns, he converted all four field goals and two extra point attempts during the narrow 26–24 road victory. Tucker was named AFC Special Teams Player of the Week for his performance against the Browns. Tucker became the first player in NFL history with six seasons of 30 or more made field goals. He was named as a first team All-Pro for the third time.

During the third quarter of the Wild Card Round against in the Los Angeles Chargers on January 6, 2019, Tucker missed a 50-yard field goal, his first career postseason miss. He would finish the game 1-of-2 as the Ravens lost 17–23.

==== 2019 ====
On April 24, 2019, Tucker signed a four-year, $23.05 million contract extension with $12 million guaranteed, keeping him under contract through the 2023 season.

During a Week 5 26–23 road victory over the Steelers, Tucker hit all four field goals, including a game-tying 48-yarder and a 46-yard game-winner in overtime, earning him AFC Special Teams Player of the Week. In the next game against the Bengals, Tucker made three field goals and two extra points en route to an 23–17 victory. He was named AFC Special Teams Player of the Week for the second consecutive week. Tucker was named AFC Special Teams Player of the Month for October. During a Week 9 37–20 victory over the Patriots, Tucker missed his first kick of the season and his second extra point of his career. During a Week 13 20–17 victory over the 49ers, Tucker made a 49-yard game winning field goal.

In the 2019 season, Tucker converted 57 of 59 extra point attempts and 28 of 29 field goal attempts. He led the NFL in extra point attempts and makes and was named to his third career pro-bowl and was First-team All-Pro. Tucker was named to the Pro Football Hall of Fame Team for the 2010s decade.

==== 2020 ====
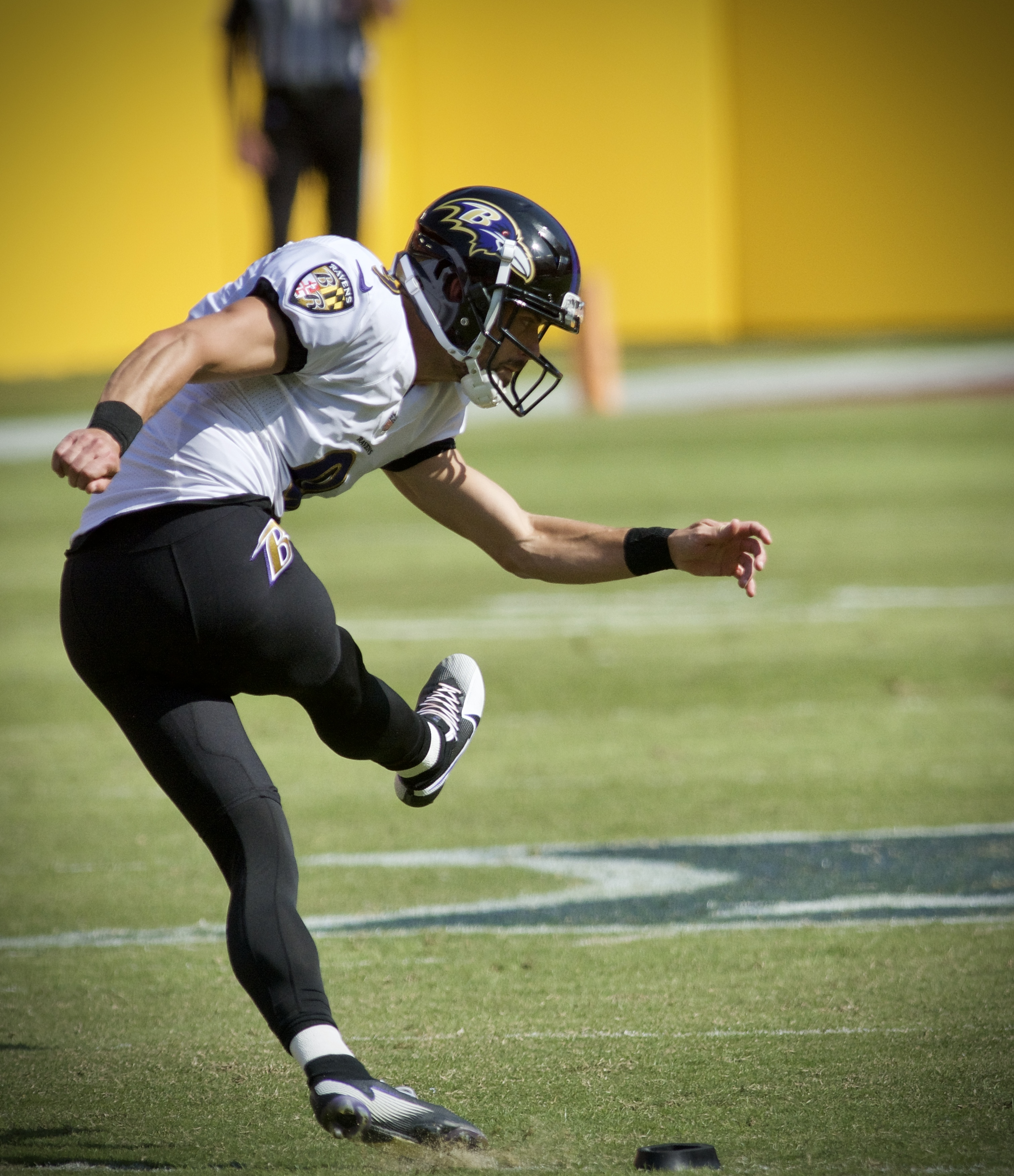
Tucker in 2020

Tucker continued his accurate kicking in 2020, with his first miss not coming until Week 5 against the Bengals, when he missed a 61-yard attempt. During a Week 14 47–42 victory over the Browns, Tucker kicked a game-winning 55-yard field goal (the Ravens would score a safety on the final play of the game). In the 2020 season, Tucker converted 52 of 53 extra point attempts and 26 of 29 field goal attempts. He was named to his fourth career Pro Bowl.

Amid difficult wind conditions during the Divisional Round against the Buffalo Bills, Tucker missed a pair of field goals in the first half that hit the left upright in the first attempt (41-yards) and the right upright in the second attempt (46-yards) in the 3–17 road loss and finished the game going one for three. It capped a postseason where Tucker struggled going only 3 of 6 on field goal attempts.

==== 2021 ====
During a narrow Week 3 19–17 road victory over the Lions, Tucker kicked an NFL record 66-yard game winning field goal as time expired in regulation. This stood as the record for the longest field goal in NFL history until November 2, 2025, when Cam Little hit from 68 yards for the Jacksonville Jaguars during their Week 9 game against the Las Vegas Raiders. Tucker finished the game with a performance reminiscent of his 2013 one and the same stadium, making four straight field goals after missing a 49-yard field goal in the first quarter. Tucker was named AFC Special Teams Player of the Week for his performance against the Lions. Tucker also converted a game-winning 36-yard field goal during a Week 9 34–31 overtime victory over the Minnesota Vikings. He finished the 2021 season converting all 32 extra point attempts and 35 of 37 field goal attempts. Tucker led the NFL among qualified kickers in field goal percentage.

Tucker was selected to his fifth Pro Bowl following the season and was named as a first team All-Pro for the fifth time. On the NFL Top 100 Players of 2022, Tucker was ranked 94th by his peers.

==== 2022 ====
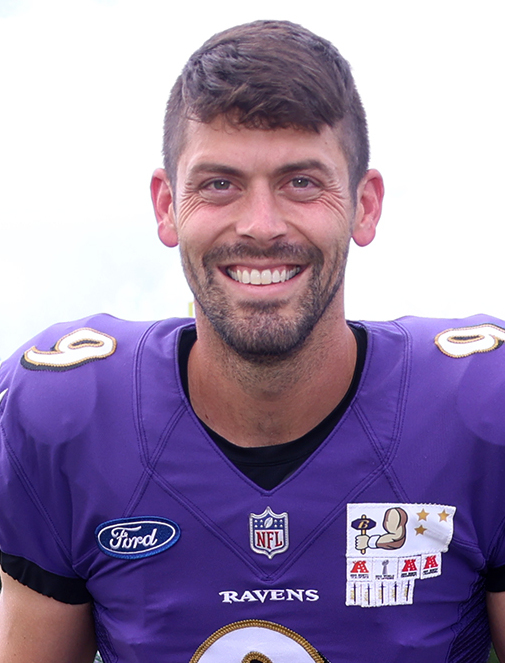
Tucker in 2022

On August 8, 2022, Tucker signed a four-year extension with the Ravens worth $24 million, making him the highest-paid kicker in the league.

During a narrow Week 5 19–17 victory over the Bengals, Tucker made the game-winning 43-yard field goal as time expired. The kick was also his 61st consecutive field goal made in the fourth quarter or overtime, which is an NFL record. During a narrow Week 12 28–27 road loss to the Jaguars, Tucker attempted to break his own record for the longest field goal in NFL history with a 67-yard field goal with two seconds left in the fourth quarter, but the attempt fell short. In the next game, he kicked the game-winning PAT in a 10–9 comeback victory over the Denver Broncos. The following week against the Steelers, Tucker became the Ravens all-time leading scorer with a 42-yard field goal in the narrow 16–14 road victory.

In the 2022 season, Tucker converted 31 of 32 extra point attempts and 37 of 43 field goal attempts. He led the NFL in field goals attempted and made and was named to his sixth career Pro-Bowl.

==== 2023 ====
Despite having a down year (which included converting only one 50+ yard field goal on five attempts), Tucker was named to his fifth straight (and seventh overall) Pro Bowl. His best game was in Week 6 when he converted 6 of 6 field goals (his only PAT was blocked) during a 24–16 victory over the Tennessee Titans in London. Tucker converted 32 of 37 field goal attempts and 51 of 52 extra point attempts in the 2023 season.

==== 2024 ====
Tucker's struggles continued into the 2024 season as he went 5 of 8 on field goal attempts, including 0 of 2 from 50+ yards, over the first four weeks of the year. During Week 5 against the Cincinnati Bengals, he converted five PATs and then tied the game with a 56-yard field goal with less than two minutes left. He kicked a 24-yard field goal in overtime to secure a 41–38 comeback victory, his first game-winning field goal since the 2022 season. Tucker's miscues escalated in Week 13 against the Philadelphia Eagles, as he missed 47-yard and 53-yard field goals in the third quarter, along with an extra point in the first quarter, marking the first time Tucker missed three kicks in a game during his career. Tucker finished the 2024 season converting 60 of 62 extra points and 22 of 30 field goal attempts.

=== Free agency ===
On May 5, 2025, the Ravens released Tucker after 13 seasons. On June 26, the NFL suspended Tucker for 10 games following an investigation into allegations that Tucker engaged in inappropriate behaviors during massage sessions.

Following the conclusion of his suspension, he had a try-out with the New Orleans Saints but lost out to Cade York. He next had a try-out with the Indianapolis Colts, who instead signed Blake Grupe, who had been waived by New Orleans.

Tucker tried out with the Saints and Colts again in July 2026, but was not signed by either. He also participated in a workout with the New York Jets ahead of the regular season.

=== Kansas City Chiefs ===
On October 28, 2026, the Kansas City Chiefs signed Tucker to their practice squad.

== NFL career statistics ==
Legend
| | Won the Super Bowl |
| | Led the league |
| **Bold** | Career high |

=== Regular season ===
| General | | | Field goals | | | | | PATs | | | Kickoffs | | | Points |
| Season | Team | GP | FGM | FGA | FG% | Blck | Long | XPM | XPA | XP% | KO | Avg | TBs | Pts |
|---|---|---|---|---|---|---|---|---|---|---|---|---|---|---|
| 2012 | BAL | 16 | 30 | 33 | 90.9% | 0 | 56 | 42 | 42 | 100.0% | 88 | **67.5** | 49 | 132 |
| 2013 | BAL | 16 | **38** | 41 | 92.7% | 0 | 61 | 26 | 26 | 100.0% | 82 | 63.4 | 42 | 140 |
| 2014 | BAL | 16 | 29 | 34 | 85.3% | 1 | 55 | 42 | 42 | 100.0% | 88 | 64.8 | 60 | 129 |
| 2015 | BAL | 16 | 33 | 40 | 82.5% | 0 | 52 | 29 | 29 | 100.0% | 74 | 64.2 | 63 | 128 |
| 2016 | BAL | 16 | **38** | 39 | **97.4%** | 1 | 57 | 27 | 27 | 100.0% | 80 | 63.4 | 52 | 141 |
| 2017 | BAL | 16 | 34 | 37 | 91.9% | 1 | 57 | 39 | 39 | 100.0% | 90 | 62.3 | 55 | 141 |
| 2018 | BAL | 16 | 35 | 39 | 89.7% | 2 | 56 | 36 | 37 | 97.3% | 92 | 63.0 | 58 | 141 |
| 2019 | BAL | 16 | 28 | 29 | 96.6% | 0 | 51 | 57 | 59 | 96.6% | **106** | 62.7 | 57 | 141 |
| 2020 | BAL | 16 | 26 | 29 | 89.7% | 0 | 55 | 52 | 53 | 98.1% | 95 | 64.1 | 65 | 130 |
| 2021 | BAL | 17 | 35 | 37 | 94.6% | 0 | **66** | 32 | 32 | 100.0% | 90 | 60.5 | 47 | 137 |
| 2022 | BAL | 17 | 37 | **43** | 86.0% | **3** | 58 | 31 | 32 | 96.9% | 86 | 63.4 | 60 | 142 |
| 2023 | BAL | 17 | 32 | 37 | 86.5% | 1 | 50 | 51 | 52 | 98.1% | 101 | 63.8 | **80** | **147** |
| 2024 | BAL | 17 | 22 | 30 | 73.3% | 0 | 56 | **60** | **62** | 96.8% | 95 | 63.9 | 68 | 126 |
| Career | | 212 | 417 | 468 | 89.1% | 9 | 66 | 524 | 532 | 98.5% | 1,167 | 63.2 | 756 | 1,775 |

=== Postseason ===
| General | | | Field goals | | | | | PATs | | | Kickoffs | | | Points |
| Season | Team | GP | FGM | FGA | FG% | Blck | Long | XPM | XPA | XP% | KO | Avg | TBs | Pts |
|---|---|---|---|---|---|---|---|---|---|---|---|---|---|---|
| 2012 | BAL | 4 | **4** | 4 | 100.0% | 0 | 47 | **16** | **16** | 100.0% | **23** | 65.3 | **12** | **28** |
| 2014 | BAL | 2 | **4** | 4 | 100.0% | 0 | 52 | 7 | 7 | 100.0% | 13 | **66.2** | 5 | 19 |
| 2018 | BAL | 1 | 1 | 2 | 50.0% | 0 | 33 | 2 | 2 | 100.0% | 0 | – | 0 | 5 |
| 2019 | BAL | 1 | 2 | 2 | 100.0% | 0 | 49 | 0 | 0 | – | 3 | 62.0 | 1 | 6 |
| 2020 | BAL | 2 | 3 | **6** | 50.0% | 0 | 51 | 2 | 2 | 100.0% | 7 | 64.0 | 4 | 11 |
| 2022 | BAL | 1 | 1 | 1 | 100.0% | 0 | 22 | 2 | 2 | 100.0% | 4 | 62.0 | 2 | 5 |
| 2023 | BAL | 2 | 3 | 3 | 100.0% | 0 | **53** | 5 | 5 | 100.0% | 10 | 63.6 | 7 | 14 |
| 2024 | BAL | 2 | 2 | 2 | 100.0% | 0 | 47 | 5 | 5 | 100.0% | | | | 11 |
| Career | | 15 | 20 | 24 | 83.3% | 0 | 53 | 39 | 39 | 100.0% | 60 | 64.7 | 31 | 99 |

=== NFL records and honors ===
- Seasons with 30 made field goals: 9
- Fastest kicker to 1,000 points: 2019
- Fastest kicker to reach 300 career field goals: 2021
- NFL Moment of the Year: 2021

=== Ravens franchise records ===
- Most field goals made: 395
- Most points scored, career: 1,775
- Most field goals in a single season: 38 (2013, 2016)
- 50+ yard field goals in one game: 3 (2016; tied)
- Most points scored in a single season: 149 (2023)
- Most field goals in a single game: 6, vs. Detroit Lions (2013) and vs. Tennessee Titans (2023)

== Personal life ==
Tucker identifies as a devout Catholic and made the sign of the cross before every kick.

Tucker is a classically trained bass-baritone who can sing opera in seven languages. He has been asked by both the Baltimore Symphony Orchestra and Opera Orchestra of New York for performances, although Tucker was unable to participate. In 2015, he was contracted by Royal Farms to sing for its line of commercials. That year, Tucker sang "Ave Maria" for a Catholic Charities benefit concert with the Concert Artists of Baltimore. His opera talents also led Tucker through to the finals of the Most Valuable Performer, a talent show featuring talent performances of NFL players, where he won thanks to his rendition of "Ave Maria." For his victory, Tucker received a ring and won $50,000 for his charity through the Baltimore School for the Arts.

Tucker married Amanda Bass in March 2015. They have a son.

=== Sexual misconduct allegations ===
In January 2025, The Baltimore Banner published first-hand testimonies from six massage therapists accusing Tucker of inappropriate sexual behavior from 2012 to 2016, alleging that he had intentionally exposed his genitals, brushed his penis on some of the therapists, and left semen on the massage table after three of his treatments. In interviews, several therapists said that Tucker's behavior led them to end his sessions early or refused to work on him again, and two spas banned him from returning. Attorneys representing Tucker denied the accusations detailed in the Banner's report, calling them speculative and "impossible to prove", as well as denying that Tucker was banned from the two spas and that he ever ejaculated at a spa. His attorneys also directed The Baltimore Banner to more than a dozen massage therapists Tucker worked with—the Banner reached out to eleven and received responses from four, all of which described positive experiences with Tucker—and provided emails showing that one of the spas he was reportedly banned from was "actively inviting him back for additional appointments". Another ten massage therapists came forward with accusations against Tucker after the Banner published their first story, including one who alleged that Tucker had stroked her inner thigh during a massage and left ejaculate on the table.

Tucker released a statement following the story's publication denying the allegations and accusing the Banner of refusing to reveal what it was writing about him until he hired a defamation attorney, giving Tucker little time to respond before the story was published, and failing to reach out to "any of the bodywork professionals I have worked with closely for the better part of the last decade". The Ravens and the NFL also released separate statements acknowledging the story, with the NFL saying that it would look into the matter. Royal Farms, a local convenience store chain that has hired Tucker as a pitchman in television commercials since 2015, said that it would be "closely monitoring" the accusations against Tucker, but declined to comment on whether the company would make any changes to its advertising plans or continue having Tucker as a spokesperson. In February 2025, Tucker released another statement again denying the allegations, but apologizing to "anyone I have worked with" that felt that Tucker did not treat them professionally or as a person.

On June 26, 2025, the NFL announced Tucker would be suspended for the first 10 weeks of the 2025 season. He declined to appeal the NFL's decision, which would have led to the release of the disciplinary officer's findings, with his agent saying that Tucker hoped to "put this difficult episode behind him and get back on the field as soon as possible" while still standing by his previous statements declaring his innocence.

== See also ==
- Most accurate kickers in NFL history
