= Morgan Cox =

American football player (born 1986)

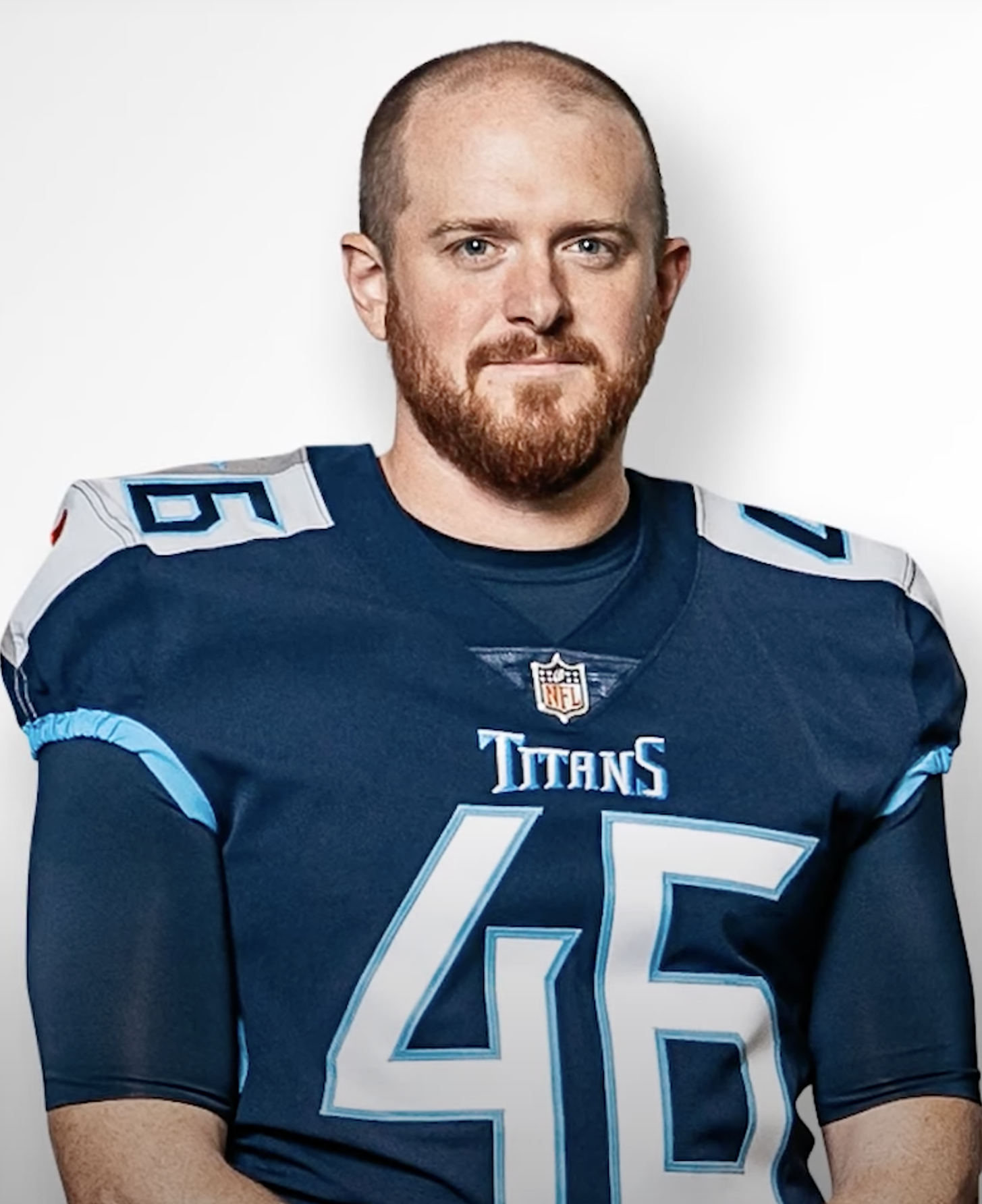
- Cox in 2021

No. 46 – Tennessee Titans
- Position: Long snapper
- Roster status: Active

Personal information
- Born: April 26, 1986 (age 40); Collierville, Tennessee, U.S.
- Listed height: 6 ft 4 in (1.93 m)
- Listed weight: 233 lb (106 kg)

Career information
- High school: Evangelical Christian (Cordova, Tennessee)
- College: Tennessee (2005–2009)
- NFL draft: 2010: undrafted

Career history
- Baltimore Ravens (2010–2020); Tennessee Titans (2021–present)

Awards and highlights
- Super Bowl champion (XLVII); First-team All-Pro (2020); 5× Pro Bowl (2015, 2016, 2019, 2020, 2022)

Career NFL statistics as of Week 10, 2026
- Games played: 259
- Tackles: 17
- Fumble recoveries: 1
- Stats at Pro Football Reference

Morgan Cox (born April 26, 1986) is an American professional football long snapper for the Tennessee Titans of the National Football League (NFL). He played college football for the Tennessee Volunteers and was signed by the Baltimore Ravens as an undrafted free agent in 2010. Cox spent 11 seasons with the Ravens from 2010 to 2020, winning Super Bowl XLVII with the team during the 2012 season.

== College career ==
Cox was a walk-on for the Tennessee Volunteers football team as a long snapper, earning a scholarship prior to the 2008 season. Cox was the starting long snapper for Tennessee for the 2007, 2008, and 2009 seasons. He earned Academic All-SEC honors from 2006 to 2009.

Cox was invited to participate in the 2010 Senior Bowl that took place on January 30, 2010.

== Professional career ==
Pre-draft measurables
Height	Weight	40-yard dash	10-yard split	20-yard split	20-yard shuttle	Vertical jump	Broad jump	Bench press
6 ft 2 3/4 in (1.90 m)	245 lb (111 kg)	5.06 s	1.77 s	2.91 s	4.47 s	27.0 in (0.69 m)	8 ft 10 in (2.69 m)	21 reps
All values from Pro Day

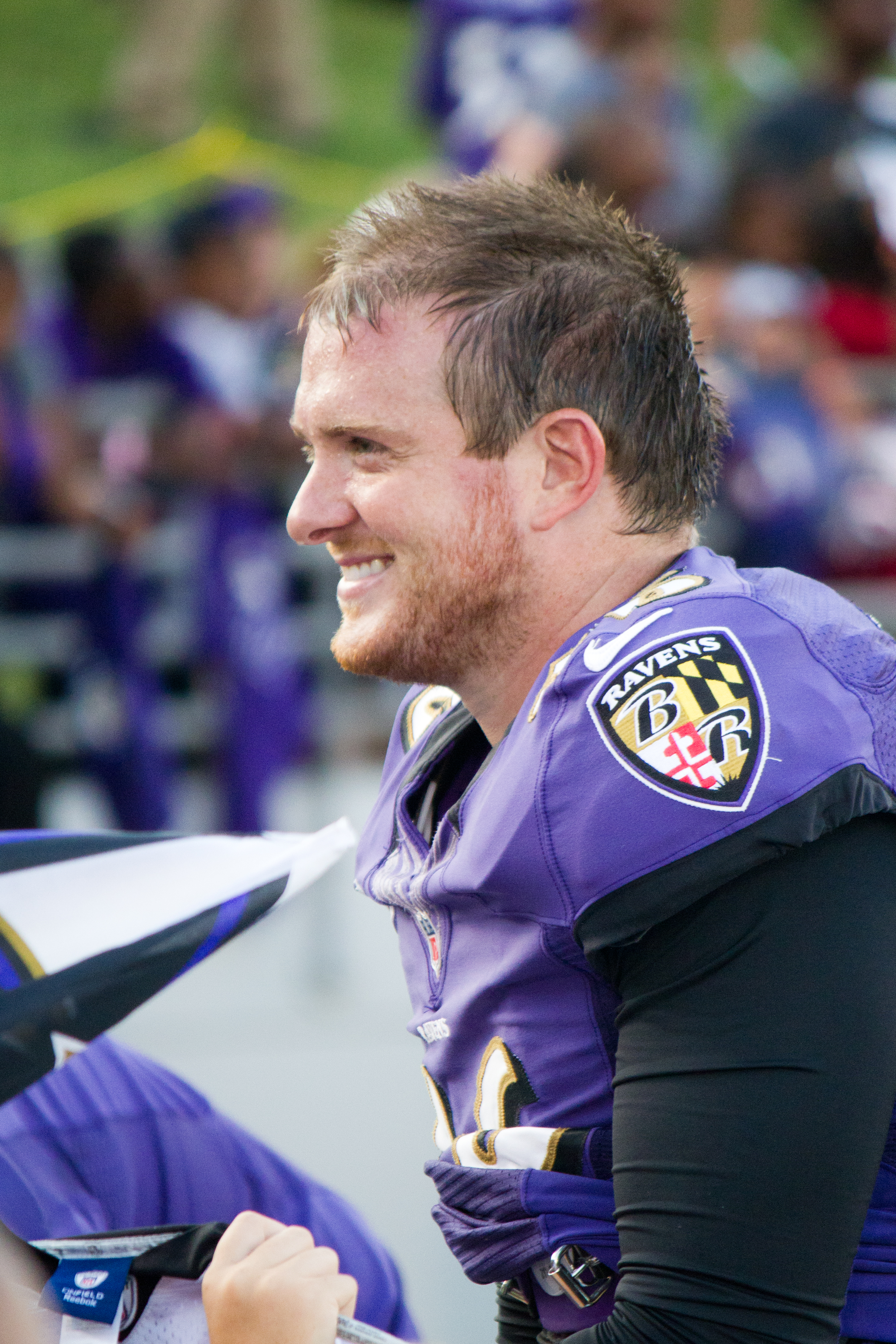
Cox in 2012

=== Baltimore Ravens ===
Cox was signed by the Baltimore Ravens as an undrafted free agent following the 2010 NFL draft on May 6, 2010. He earned the starting long snapper job after the Ravens released Matt Katula on August 14, 2010. Cox was part of the 2012 Baltimore Ravens Super Bowl XLVII victory over the San Francisco 49ers on February 3, 2013. In the season opener of the 2013 season against the Denver Broncos, Cox recovered a punt that was muffed by Wes Welker. On October 19, 2014, Cox tore his ACL against the Atlanta Falcons and was placed on season ending injured reserve the day after. He was replaced by Kevin McDermott for the remainder of the season. Cox recovered from the injury, and resumed his long snapping duties for the 2015 season. Cox, along with punter Sam Koch and kicker Justin Tucker, were known as the "Wolfpack" and considered the best special teams unit as a trio.

On March 7, 2016, Cox signed a five-year contract extension with the Ravens. He made the Pro Bowl for a second consecutive season for the 2016 season. Cox made his third Pro Bowl for the 2019 season.

In 2020, Cox was one of 18 players placed on the reserve/COVID-19 list before the Ravens' Week 12 game against the Pittsburgh Steelers. He was placed on the list on November 27, 2020, and activated on December 7. He was replaced by Nick Moore. He earned his fourth Pro Bowl nomination. He became the first long snapper to ever be selected to first-team All-Pro (this was the first year the NFL had long snappers on the ballot). However, on January 25, 2021, the Ravens announced that they would be going with Nick Moore for the next season and would not be re-signing Cox.

=== Tennessee Titans ===
On March 18, 2021, Cox signed a one-year contract with the Tennessee Titans. He re-signed with the team on March 10, 2022. He was named to the Pro Bowl for his 2022 season.

On March 10, 2023, Cox re-signed on another one-year contract, and again on March 7, 2024. He appeared in all 17 games in the 2023 season. Cox was named a team captain ahead of the 2024 season, where he played all 17 games and recorded a career high three tackles on punt coverage.

On March 10, 2025, Cox re-signed with the Titans on a one-year contract for the fifth consecutive time.

On March 9, 2026, Cox re-signed with the Titans on a one-year contract.

== Personal life ==
March 7, 2013, was proclaimed "Morgan Cox Day" in Cox's hometown of Collierville, Tennessee. His wife, Lauren Cox, is an actress, writer, and producer.
