= Nick Moore (American football) =

American football player (born 1992)

No. 46 – Baltimore Ravens
- Position: Long snapper
- Roster status: Active

Personal information
- Born: December 9, 1992 (age 33); Atlanta, Georgia, U.S.
- Listed height: 6 ft 2 in (1.88 m)
- Listed weight: 260 lb (118 kg)

Career information
- High school: Brookwood (Snellville, Georgia)
- College: Georgia (2015–2018)
- NFL draft: 2019: undrafted

Career history
- New Orleans Saints (2019)*; Tampa Bay Vipers (2020); Baltimore Ravens (2020–present)
- * Offseason or practice squad member only

Awards and highlights
- Second-team All-Pro (2022)

Career NFL statistics as of Week 8, 2026
- Games played: 77
- Total tackles: 11
- Stats at Pro Football Reference

Nicholas Robert Moore (born December 9, 1992) is an American professional football long snapper for the Baltimore Ravens of the National Football League (NFL). He played professional baseball in the Boston Red Sox organization before playing college football at Georgia.

== Baseball career ==
Moore spent four seasons in the minor league system of the Boston Red Sox after being drafted in the 30th round of the 2011 MLB draft out of high school. He primarily played for the Lowell Spinners at first base and third base. In 195 total minor league games, he batted .211/.304/.314 with 11 home runs, 75 RBI, and 27 stolen bases.

== College career ==
Moore played college football at Georgia, where he was recruited to play linebacker and also played fullback. He switched to long snapper in 2017. He competed in 23 games over his Bulldogs career, including 14 as a senior in 2018.

== Professional career ==
Pre-draft measurables
| Height | Weight | Arm length | Hand span | Wingspan | 40-yard dash | 10-yard split | 20-yard split | 20-yard shuttle | Three-cone drill | Vertical jump | Broad jump | Bench press |
|---|---|---|---|---|---|---|---|---|---|---|---|---|
| 6 ft 2 1/4 in (1.89 m) | 244 lb (111 kg) | 30 1/4 in (0.77 m) | 9 3/4 in (0.25 m) | 6 ft 1 5/8 in (1.87 m) | 5.03 s | 1.74 s | 2.88 s | 4.44 s | 7.20 s | 30.0 in (0.76 m) | 9 ft 3 in (2.82 m) | 18 reps |
All values from Pro Day

=== New Orleans Saints ===
Moore went undrafted during the 2019 NFL draft. Moore signed with the New Orleans Saints as an undrafted free agent on April 28, 2019. He was waived by the Saints on August 21.

=== Tampa Bay Vipers ===
Moore signed with the Tampa Bay Vipers of the XFL after being drafted in Phase 5 of the 2020 XFL draft. The league suspended its season after six games, and allowed players to sign with NFL teams starting on March 23, 2020.

=== Baltimore Ravens ===
On March 26, 2020, Moore signed with the Baltimore Ravens. He was waived during final roster cuts on September 5, and signed to the Ravens' practice squad the next day. He was elevated to the active roster on December 2 for the team's week 12 game against the Pittsburgh Steelers after Morgan Cox was placed on the COVID-19 list, and reverted to the practice squad after the game. On January 18, 2021, Moore signed a reserve/futures contract with the Ravens. On January 25, the Ravens announced that they would be parting ways with Cox and going with Moore for the next season.

On March 9, 2022, the Ravens placed an exclusive-rights free agent tender on Moore. He was named second-team All-Pro for his performance during the 2022 season.

During the 2023 offseason, Moore tore his Achilles tendon, ending his season, with Tyler Ott filling in for the Ravens during 2023. Moore returned for the 2024 season.

On January 2, 2026, the Ravens signed Moore to a four-year contract extension.
