= Harbaugh family =

Prominent family in American football

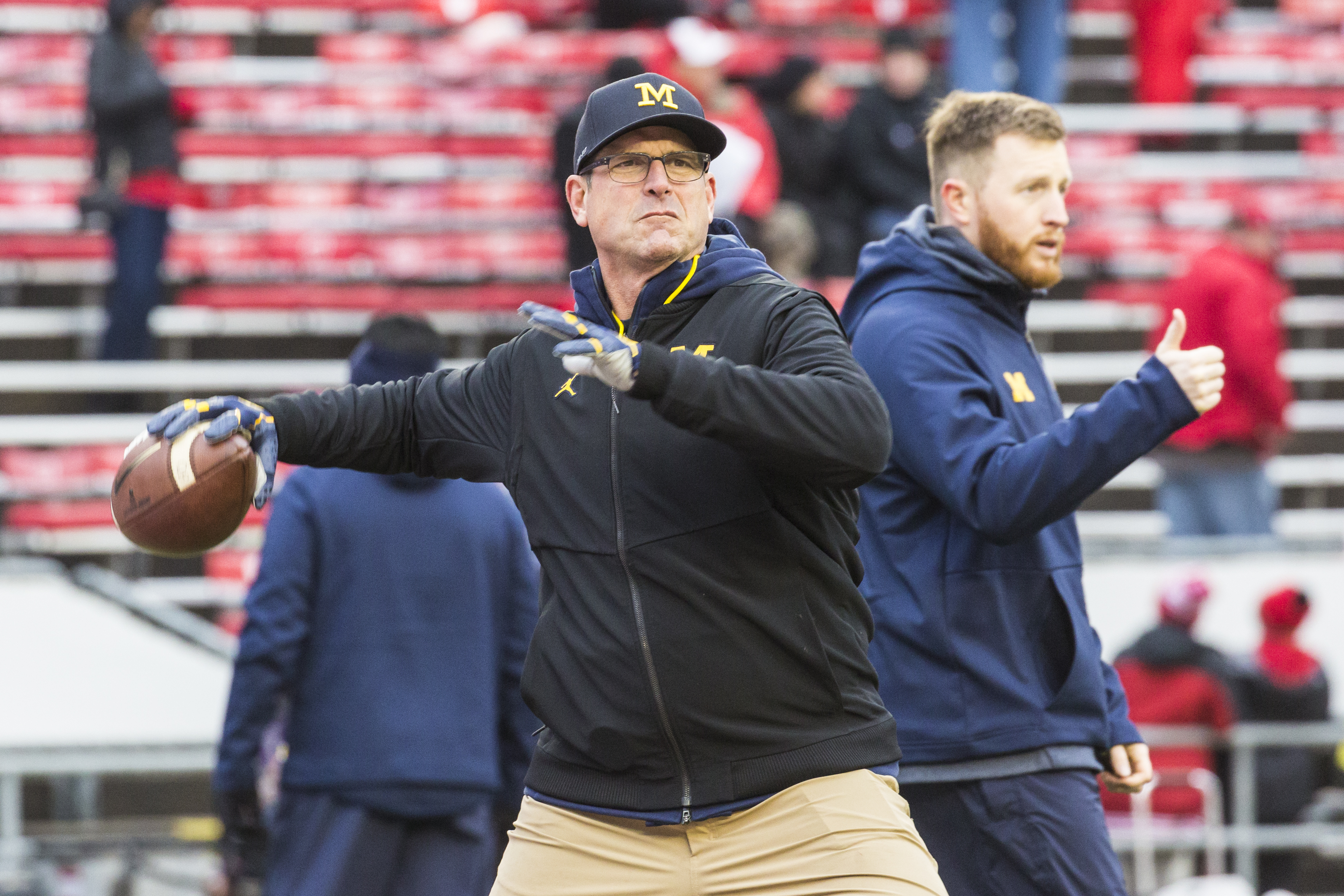
Jim (left) and his son Jay on the coaching staff for the Michigan Wolverines football team in 2017

The Harbaughs are an American family who have had several members become notable in the sport of American football, both at the collegiate and professional level and as both players and coaches. In 2024, journalist Gilbert McGregor of The Sporting News reported of the family, "Among the many royal families in American football, the Harbaughs are one of the most prominent."

Jack Harbaugh, who played collegiately in the 1950s, had a successful career on the coaching staff for several colleges, both as an assistant and head coach. In 2002, he led the Western Kentucky Hilltoppers football team to a championship in the NCAA Division I-AA Football Championship. His oldest son, John, similarly served as an assistant coach for several college teams before joining the coaching staff of the NFL's Philadelphia Eagles. For 18 seasons, he served as the head coach for the Baltimore Ravens, who he led to a victory in Super Bowl XLVII. Jim, John's younger brother, had a successful playing career as a quarterback, first for the Michigan Wolverines football team and later for several NFL teams. He has served as the head coach for several college and professional teams, including the Stanford Cardinal, the Michigan Wolverines, the San Francisco 49ers, and, currently, the Los Angeles Chargers. He led the Wolverines to a victory in the 2024 College Football Playoff National Championship and the 49ers to an appearance in Super Bowl XLVII, losing to his brother John's Ravens. Currently, Jim's son Jay serves on the coaching staff for the Seattle Seahawks.

== History ==
=== First generation ===
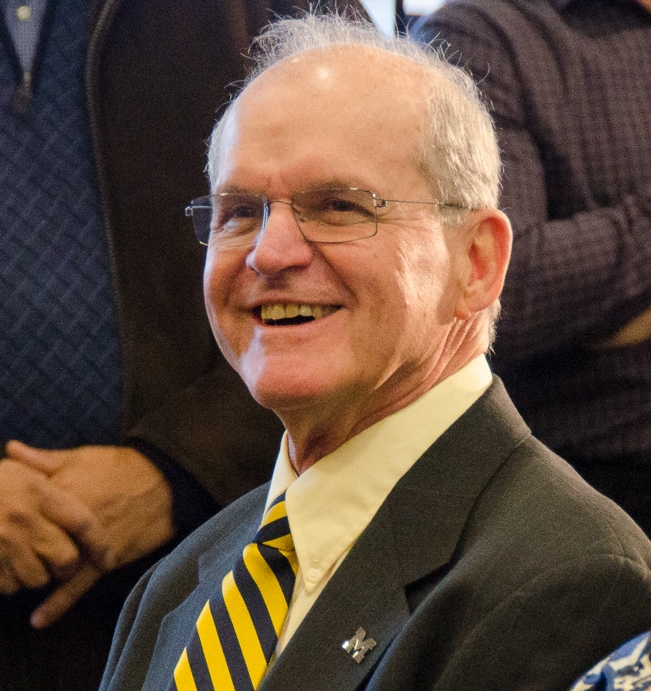
- Jack in 2014
  Jack played collegiately for the Bowling Green Falcons football team. He played safety from 1957 to 1960. In 1959, the team claimed a national championship for small colleges. After college, Jack served as a high school football coach before serving as an assistant coach for various college football teams. His first collegiate head coaching position was for the Western Michigan Broncos football team in the 1980s, and he later also served as the head coach for the Western Kentucky Hilltoppers football team, leading them to an NCAA Division I-AA Football Championship for the 2002 season. He later had a brief stint in the National Football League, serving as the running backs coach for the San Diego Chargers from 2004 to 2006 and later held assistant coaching positions at college teams coached by his son Jim.

=== Second generation ===
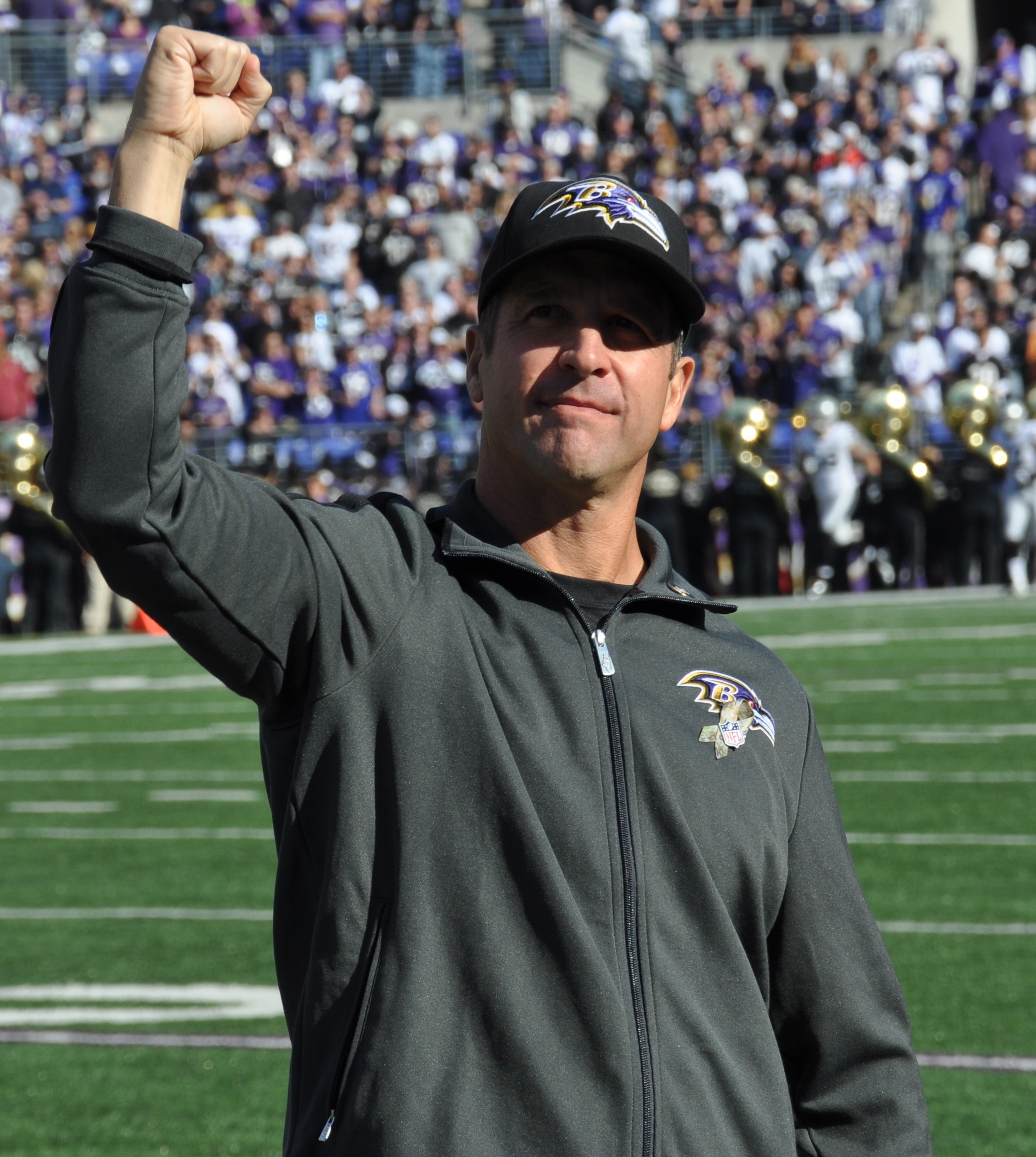
- John as the head coach of the Baltimore Ravens in 2012
  John played collegiately for the Miami Redskins football team. After graduating, he served as an assistant coach for several college teams, including the Cincinnati Bearcats and the Indiana Hoosiers. From 1998 to 2007, he served on the coaching staff for the Philadelphia Eagles under head coach Andy Reid, initially as a special teams coordinator and later as a defensive backs coach. From 2008 to 2025, he served as the head coach for the Baltimore Ravens, having led them to multiple NFL playoffs appearances and a victory in Super Bowl XLVII. In 2026, he became the head coach of the New York Giants.
- Jim played collegiately for the Michigan Wolverines football team, serving as a quarterback from 1983 to 1986. Following this, he spent 14 years playing professionally in the NFL for multiple teams, including the Chicago Bears, Indianapolis Colts, Baltimore Ravens, and the San Diego Chargers. After a brief stint as an assistant coach for the Oakland Raiders, he turned to head coaching in college football with the San Diego Toreros football team and, later, the Stanford Cardinal football team, leading the latter to a victory in the 2011 Orange Bowl. From 2011 to 2014, he served as the head coach for the San Francisco 49ers, leading them to several NFL playoffs appearances, including a losing effort in Super Bowl XLVII against John's Ravens team. In 2015, he became the head coach for the Wolverines, leading them to multiple conference championships and a victory in the 2024 College Football Playoff National Championship. Prior to the 2024 NFL season, he became the head coach of the Los Angeles Chargers.

=== Third generation ===
- Jay, Jim's son, served as a quality control coach for the Baltimore Ravens (coached by John) from 2012 to 2014. Starting in 2015, he served on the coaching staff for the Michigan Wolverines under his father, head coach Jim. Since 2024, he has served as the special teams coordinator for the Seattle Seahawks.

== Family tree ==
Jack (born 1939)
  - John (born 1962)
    - Alison (born 2001)
  - Jim (born 1963)
    - Jay (born 1989)
    - James Jr. (born 1996)
    - Grace (born 2000)
    - Addison (born 2008)
    - Katherine (born 2010)
    - Jack (born 2012)
    - John Paul (born 2017)
  - Joani (born 1968)
    - Megan Crean (born 1995)
    - Riley Crean (born 1999)
    - Ainsley Crean (born 2005)

== See also ==
- Manning family, another prominent family in American football
- Tom Crean (basketball), a basketball coach who married Joani Harbaugh
