= Jay Harbaugh =

American football coach (born 1989)

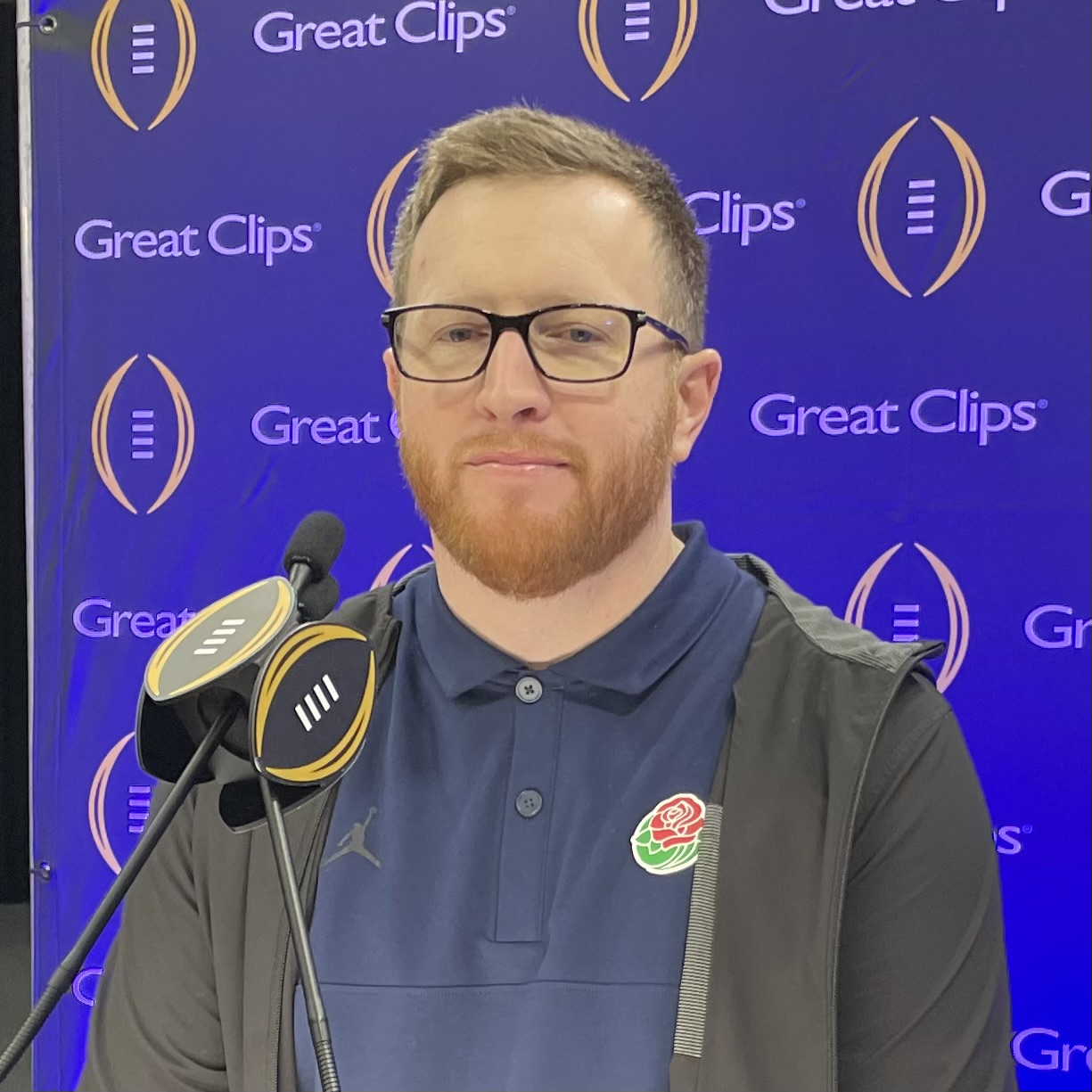
- Harbaugh in 2024

Seattle Seahawks
- Title: Special teams coordinator

Personal information
- Born: June 14, 1989 (age 37); San Diego, California, U.S.

Career information
- College: Oregon State University

Career history
- Oregon State (2008–2011) Student assistant; Baltimore Ravens (2012–2014) Offensive quality control coach; Michigan (2015–2023); Tight ends coach & assistant special teams coach (2015–2016); Running backs coach & assistant special teams coach (2017–2018); Special teams coordinator & running backs coach (2019–2020); Special teams coordinator & tight ends coach (2021); Special teams coordinator & safeties coach (2022–2023); Seattle Seahawks (2024–present) Special teams coordinator

Awards and highlights
- 2× Super Bowl champion (XLVII, LX); CFP national champion (2023)

Jay Patrick Harbaugh (/ˈhɑːrbɔː/; born June 14, 1989) is an American professional football coach who is the special teams coordinator for the Seattle Seahawks of the National Football League (NFL). A member of the Harbaugh family, he is the son of Los Angeles Chargers head coach Jim Harbaugh, grandson of former player and coach Jack Harbaugh, and the nephew of New York Giants head coach John Harbaugh.

== Early life and family ==
A native of San Diego, Harbaugh attended St. Augustine High School in San Diego and Choate Rosemary Hall in Wallingford, Connecticut. He played defensive line in high school, but knee injuries ended his career. Harbaugh earned a bachelor's degree in sociology from Oregon State University, and completed an internship with the San Francisco 49ers prior to his senior year.

== Coaching career ==
=== Oregon State ===
Harbaugh spent four seasons as an undergraduate assistant at Oregon State under head coach Mike Riley. Riley was the head coach of the San Diego Chargers in 1999 and 2000 when Jay's father Jim was playing quarterback for the Chargers.

=== Baltimore Ravens ===
Harbaugh spent three seasons working in Baltimore for the Ravens under his uncle, John Harbaugh. In 2014, his work focused on statistical analysis, self-scouting reports and breakdowns of opposing defenses. He was on the Ravens' staff the year they beat his father's San Francisco 49ers in Super Bowl XLVII.

=== Michigan ===
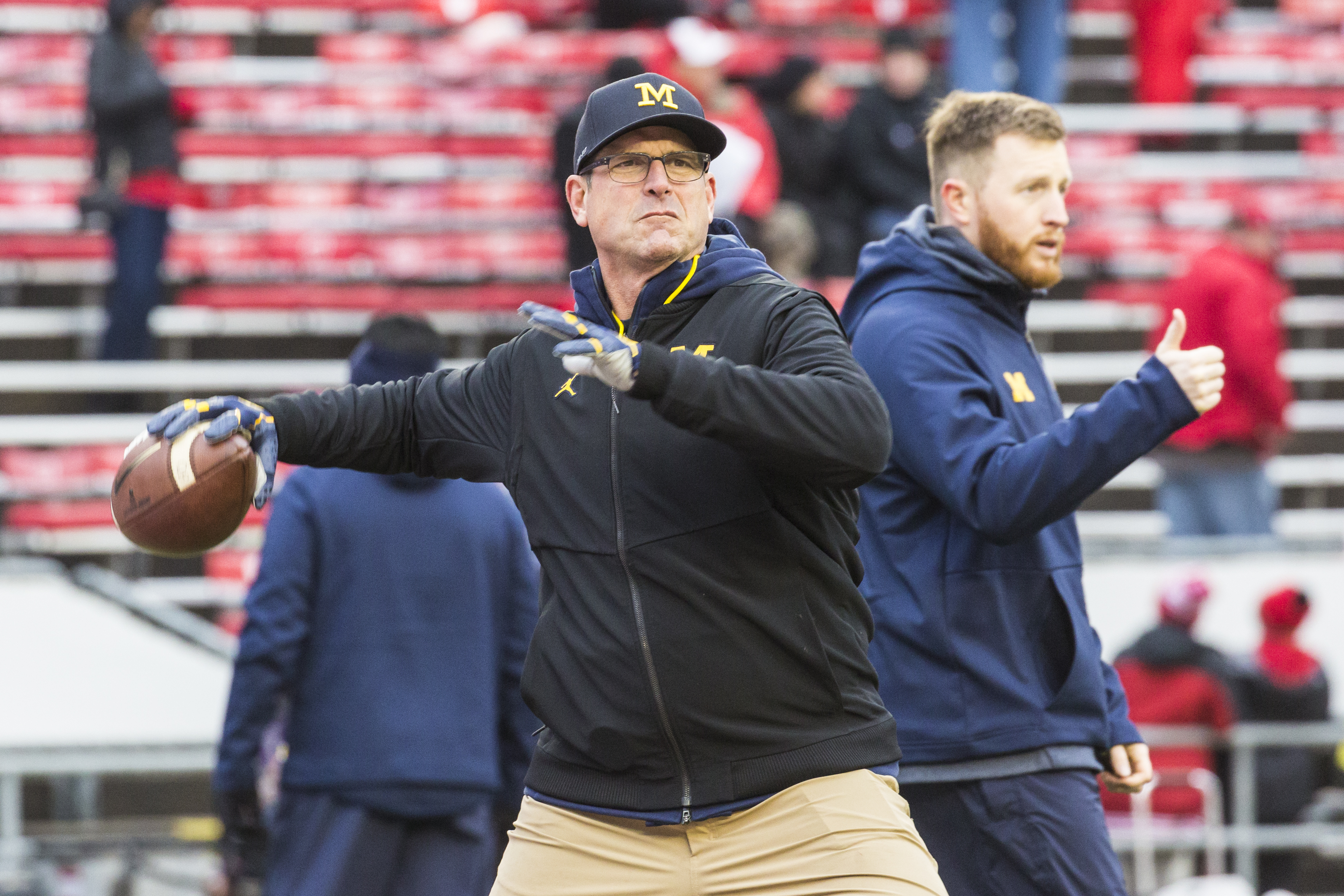
Harbaugh (background) alongside his father Jim (foreground) with Michigan in 2017.

On January 20, 2015, Harbaugh was officially introduced as part of the Michigan football staff and served as the tight ends coach and as an assistant special teams coach for the Wolverines. For the 2017 season, he was named running backs and special teams coach. He moved back to tight ends and special teams coach for the 2021 season. Prior to the 2022 season, Michigan announced that Harbaugh would coach safeties in addition to coordinating special teams, with Ronald Bellamy moving from safeties to wide receivers, and Grant Newsome taking over duties as tight ends coach.

Following the 2021 season, Harbaugh was named the FootballScoop.com Special Teams Coordinator of the Year.

In the wake of Jim Harbaugh's three-game suspension to open the 2023 season, it was announced that Harbaugh would serve as interim head coach for the first half of Michigan's second game of the season against UNLV. On September 9, 2023, Harbaugh led the Wolverines to a 35–7 win over the Rebels, giving him his first official win as a college football head coach.

=== Seattle Seahawks ===
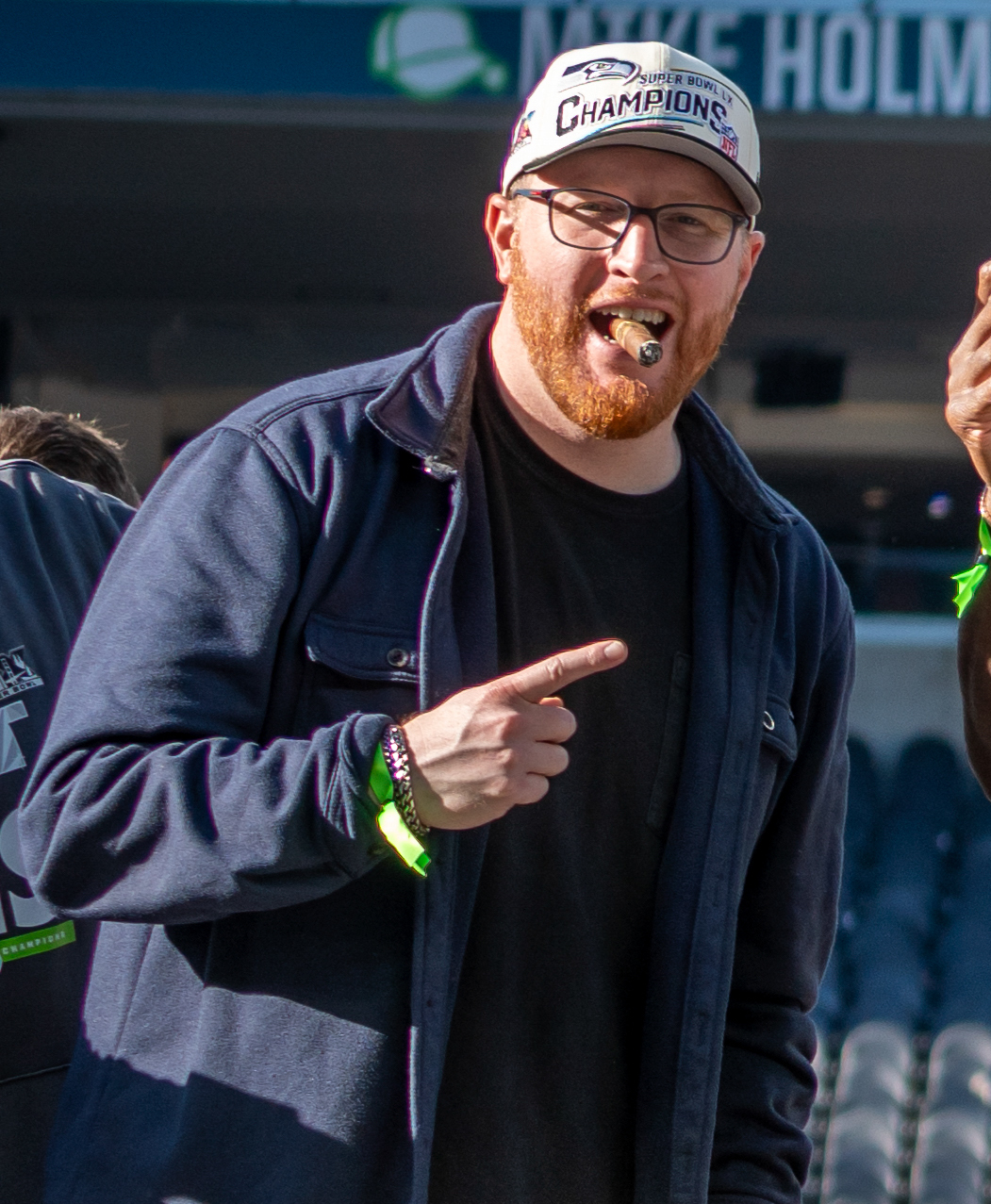
Harbaugh at the Super Bowl LX parade

On February 13, 2024, Harbaugh was hired as the special teams coach for the Seattle Seahawks. He was part of the coaching staff that won Super Bowl LX over the New England Patriots 29–13.

== Personal life ==
Harbaugh and his wife, Britney, have two children.

== Head coaching record ==
Year	Team	Overall	Conference	Standing	Bowl/playoffs	Coaches^{#}	AP^{°}
Michigan Wolverines (Big Ten Conference) (2023)
2023	Michigan	1–0 (Note: Michigan's head coach, Jim Harbaugh, was suspended for the first three games of the 2023 season. Jesse Minter served as interim head coach for the first game of the season, Jay Harbaugh and Mike Hart were interim co-head coaches for the second game, and Sherrone Moore served as interim head coach for the third game.)	0–0	(East)			
Michigan:		1–0	0–0				
Total:		1–0					
