= Christian Watford =

American basketball player (born 1991)

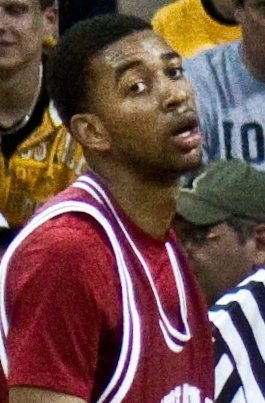
- Watford with Indiana in 2010.

Personal information
- Born: April 28, 1991 (age 35) Birmingham, Alabama
- Listed height: 6 ft 9 in (2.06 m)
- Listed weight: 220 lb (100 kg)

Career information
- High school: Shades Valley (Birmingham, Alabama)
- College: Indiana (2009–2013)
- NBA draft: 2013: undrafted
- Playing career: 2013–2019
- Position: Power forward

Career history
- 2013–2014: Hapoel Eilat
- 2014–2015: Maine Red Claws
- 2015: Reno Bighorns
- 2016–2017: Fort Wayne Mad Ants
- 2017–2019: Raptors 905

Career highlights
- NBA D-League champion (2017); Third-team All-Big Ten (2013); Big Ten All-Freshman Team (2010)
- Stats at Basketball Reference

Christian Ramon Watford (born April 28, 1991) is an American former professional basketball player. He played college basketball for Indiana University.

== High school career ==
Watford played high school basketball at Shades Valley High School in the Birmingham, Alabama suburb of Irondale where he graduated from in 2009 with a 3.5 GPA. As a junior, he averaged 22 points and 14 rebounds. As a senior, he averaged 25 points and 13 rebounds and helped guide them to a 26–6 season and was named to the Birmingham News Super Senior team. After his senior year, ESPN ranked Watford 26th overall and 4th small forward in the nation in the 2009 class. He was ranked the 34th overall recruit by Rivals.com and the 6th small forward, while Scout.com ranked him 72nd overall and the 15th small forward.

== College career ==
On September 9, 2008, Watford committed to play for Indiana University under Coach Tom Crean, turning down offers from Alabama, Louisville, and Memphis. Upon committing he said of Indiana, "They have a real good basketball tradition there and I think coach Crean is going to come in and restore the program. Basically, I just like their tradition. It's Indiana, you know." Watford is well known for his game-winning shot against Kentucky, beating the undefeated Wildcats.

In his junior year at Indiana, the 2011–12 season, Watford averaged 12.6 points, 5.8 rebounds and 28.4 minutes per game. He averaged 41.6% from the field and 81.5% from the free throw line. On December 10, 2011, Indiana defeated top-ranked Kentucky at the last second on a 3-pointer by Watford, giving the Hoosiers a stunning 73–72 upset victory. Watford finished the game with 20 points and 5 rebounds while going 4 for 6 on 3-pointers. Watford's last second shot sent Indiana fans storming the court and crowding around players. Kentucky's loss was their only one of the regular season and prevented them from matching a record last set by Indiana's 1975–76 team. The shot won the 2012 ESPY Award for "Best Play" and was named the 2012 GEICO Play of the Year. Video of Indiana fans reacting to the shot around the country went viral. After the game Watford said, "I haven't felt anything like that. It's probably the most memorable moment of my life, definitely of my career." The Hoosiers earned a number four seed in the 2012 NCAA tournament and defeated New Mexico State in the second round. After defeating VCU in the third round, the Hoosiers lost to Kentucky in the Sweet Sixteen. At the end of the season Watford was named to the NCAA's All-South Region Team.

Although reports suggested Watford would enter the 2012 NBA draft, he opted instead to return and play for the Hoosiers, stating "I'm looking forward to the opportunity to complete my degree and to continue restoring the winning tradition at IU. I believe in Coach Crean and our staff and I am eager to lead my new teammates and build on what we started."

Due in part to Watford's leadership, the Hoosiers finished the 2012–13 season as the outright Big Ten champions. He averaged 12.4 points and 6.4 rebounds per game while shooting 48.6% from the three-point line, which ranked tops in the Big Ten ahead of his teammate Jordan Hulls. Watford also shot 82% from the free throw line, ranking third in the league and ninth in rebounding. The coaches and media named him a Third Team All-Big Ten honoree. Indiana earned a number 1 seed, and then went on to defeat James Madison and Temple University, before falling to Syracuse in the Sweet 16.

Watford earned his Bachelor of Science degree in kinesiology with a concentration in sports broadcasting in May 2013.

== Professional career ==
After going undrafted in the 2013 NBA draft, Watford joined the Indiana Pacers for the Orlando Summer League and the Dallas Mavericks for the Las Vegas Summer League. On July 30, 2013, he signed with Hapoel Eilat of Israel for the 2013–14 season. In 37 games (23 starts), he averaged 9.9 points and 5.2 rebounds per game.

In July 2014, Watford joined the Detroit Pistons for the Orlando Summer League and the Golden State Warriors for the Las Vegas Summer League. On September 29, 2014, he signed with the Boston Celtics. However, he was later waived by the Celtics on October 27, 2014. Four days later, he was acquired by the Maine Red Claws as an affiliate player. On March 4, 2015, he was traded to the Reno Bighorns in exchange for the returning player rights to DeQuan Jones. On March 28, Watford was waived by Reno.

On October 31, 2016, Watford was reacquired by the Fort Wayne Mad Ants. On January 27, 2017, he was traded to the Raptors 905.

In the summers of 2015, '16, and 2017, Watford played in The Basketball Tournament on ESPN for team Armored Athlete. He competed for the $2 million prize, and helped take team Armored Athlete to the West Regional Championship, where they lost to Team Challenge ALS 75–63. In TBT 2018, he played for Eberlein Drive. Eberlein Drive made it to the championship game, where they lost to Overseas Elite.

== Personal life ==
Watford is the son of Ernest and Belinda Watford, and has a sister, Elise, and a brother, Trendon.
