= 2011 Indiana vs. Kentucky men's basketball game =

2011 college basketball game

Non-conference game
Kentucky Wildcats	Indiana Hoosiers
(8–0)	(8–0)
72	73
Head coach: John Calipari	Head coach: Tom Crean
- AP: 1
- Coaches: 1
	1st half	2nd half	Total
Kentucky Wildcats	29	43	72
Indiana Hoosiers	30	43	73
- Date: December 10, 2011
- Venue: Assembly Hall, Bloomington, Indiana
- Favorite: Kentucky by 5.5 points
- Referees: Ted Valentine, Mike Kitts, Tom Eades
- Attendance: 17,472

United States TV coverage
- Network: ESPN
- Announcers: Dan Shulman, Dick Vitale
- Nielsen Ratings: 2.3

The 2011 Indiana vs. Kentucky men's basketball game was a college basketball game between the Hoosiers of Indiana University Bloomington and Wildcats of the University of Kentucky who was ranked number 1 in the nation. A rivalry game between the two schools, this game was held at Assembly Hall on Indiana's campus. In an upset victory that was considered a turning point for the Hoosiers program, unranked Indiana defeated top-ranked Kentucky 73–72 on a buzzer-beating three-pointer by Christian Watford, which was nicknamed the "Watshot".

== Background ==
=== Indiana ===
Indiana entered this game with an 8–0 record and had earned 4 points in the most recent AP Poll (released on December 5), enough for 39th place of all schools receiving votes. In the Coaches Poll released the same day, Indiana earned 23 points, sufficient for 31st place in the poll. In his fourth season at Indiana, head coach Tom Crean was hired in April 2008 after previous head coach Kelvin Sampson resigned due to recruiting violations. Crean's first season in 2008–09 was the worst in school history, ending with a 6–25 record. Indiana improved to 10–21 in the 2009–10 season, and then to 12–20 in 2010–11.

=== Kentucky ===
Like Indiana, Kentucky entered this game with an 8–0 record. Kentucky was also ranked #1 in the AP and Coaches Polls. Head coach John Calipari was in his third season at Kentucky, having led Kentucky to the 2010 Elite Eight and 2011 Final Four in the previous two NCAA Tournaments. Kentucky also had a star-studded group of freshmen on its roster, consisting of four former 5-star recruits in Anthony Davis, Michael Kidd-Gilchrist, Marquis Teague, and Kyle Wiltjer.

=== Rivalry ===
Indiana and Kentucky have a basketball rivalry dating back to 1924. The rivalry series had been played annually since the 1969–70 season on a home-and-home basis. Kentucky had won the past three games in this series. For the 2011 game, students lined up as early as 10 hours before tipoff for tickets.

== Game summary ==
The game had a total of 13 lead changes, and neither team could extend its lead by much throughout the game. Kentucky's largest lead was 6 with 8:17 to go in the first half; Indiana's largest lead was 10, at 63–53 with 15:56 left in the second half. Neither team could get ahead. However, Kentucky rallied to take a 69–68 lead with 2 minutes to play, and the lead would change three more times. Indiana's Christian Watford made a layup to put Indiana up 70–69 with 1:07 left, and then Kentucky's Marquis Teague followed that up with his own layup to give Kentucky a 71–70 lead.

After Watford missed a jumper with 30 seconds left, Indiana's Cody Zeller fouled Kentucky's Anthony Davis with 19 seconds remaining. With Kentucky only in the bonus (it was Indiana's ninth 2nd-half foul), Davis missed the front end of the one-and-one free throw, and Indiana's Victor Oladipo rebounded. After an Indiana timeout, Kentucky's Doron Lamb stole the ball from Oladipo and was fouled with 5.6 seconds left. This foul put Kentucky in the double bonus; Lamb missed his first free throw attempt, but made the second to put Kentucky up 72–70. Watford inbounded the ball to Verdell Jones III, who drove the ball by a screen set by Zeller at half-court. Jones then passed the ball to Watford, who made a Darius Miller-contested three-pointer at the buzzer to win the game for Indiana, 73–72. Players, students, and fans immediately stormed the court.

== Aftermath ==
=== Impact on Indiana basketball ===
With this win, Indiana beat a #1 ranked team for the first time since beating Duke in the Sweet 16 round of the 2002 NCAA Tournament. It was also Indiana's first win over a #1 team at Assembly Hall since beating Michigan State on January 7, 2001.

Watford's game-winning, buzzer-beating shot in this game has been compared to Keith Smart's game-winner that sealed Indiana's 1987 NCAA title. Josh Sanburn wrote for Time.com:

...those familiar with today's Hoosiers know only the Big Ten bottom dwellers of the past three seasons. When Tom Crean took over...he walked into a void that formerly held an incredibly successful men's basketball program. The five banners hanging in Assembly Hall felt like they were from the Pleistocene Era.

Sanburn also characterized Watford's game-winner and the court-storming that followed as "a collective and spontaneous surge of relief" following the seasons after the firing of Bob Knight.

College Magazine also credited this game as a reason behind a "resurgence" of Indiana Hoosiers basketball.

The Hoosiers returned to the NCAA Tournament in March 2012, making it to the Sweet Sixteen. They then went to the Sweet Sixteen again in 2013 before failing to make it past the Second Round in the rest of Crean's tenure as head coach before being fired in 2017.

=== Rematch in 2012 NCAA Tournament ===
Indiana and Kentucky met again in the Sweet 16 round of the 2012 NCAA Tournament on March 23 in Atlanta. Kentucky won 102–90 and would eventually win their eighth NCAA championship.

=== Future of series ===
This game was the final regular season men's basketball matchup between Indiana and Kentucky for 14 years after Crean and Calipari could not reach an agreement on game venues. Indiana wanted to continue playing the series on a home-and-home basis rotating between the two schools' campuses, while Kentucky wanted to play on a neutral court at Lucas Oil Stadium in Indianapolis. The rivalry resumed in 2025 after Calipari's departure from Kentucky.

== Broadcasting ==
The game was televised nationally on ESPN and carried on radio by both schools' radio networks, the Indiana Hoosier Sports Network and UK Sports Network. Nielsen ratings ranked this game the 23rd most-watched program of the week ending December 13, 2011, with 3.59 million viewers and a share of 2.3. SportsBusiness Daily ranked this game the third most-watched regular season college basketball game on cable for the 2011–12 season.
