= Indiana–Kentucky rivalry =

College sports rivalry

- Indiana Hoosiers Kentucky Wildcats
- Sport: Football, basketball, baseball

Locations of Indiana and Kentucky

The Indiana–Kentucky rivalry is a college sports rivalry between the Indiana University Hoosiers and the University of Kentucky Wildcats. The rivalry between these two schools, located about 180 miles (290 km) apart, dates to their first college football game in 1893, and has continued across all sports, with the men's basketball series gaining particular attention. The football game was previously played for a wooden Bourbon Barrel trophy, which was discontinued in 1999.

== Men's basketball ==
Indiana–Kentucky men's basketball rivalry
- Indiana Hoosiers Kentucky Wildcats
- Sport: Basketball
- First meeting: December 18, 1924; Indiana 20, Kentucky 18
- Latest meeting: November 20, 2026; Indiana 90, Kentucky 76
- Next meeting: TBD

Statistics
- Total meetings: 59
- All-time series: Kentucky, 33–26
- Largest victory: Kentucky, 39 (2003)
- Current win streak: Indiana, 1

Indiana and Kentucky played against each other in men's basketball for the first time on December 18, 1924.

ESPN commentator Dick Vitale said, "Don't you get excited in the world of basketball thinking about Kentucky and Indiana playing? Two Goliaths, two elite programs." Commentator Eamonn Brennan described it as "one of the great nonconference rivalries in the sport, which features the two storied, flagship, blueblood programs from the nation's two most basketball-obsessed states, states which just so happen to share a border."

High-profile feuds and incidents between the schools' programs have fueled the rivalry over the years. Indiana coach Bob Knight would frequently suggest that Kentucky violated NCAA recruiting rules. When asked about the rivalry by Kentucky announcer Cawood Ledford, Knight said, "You know, Cawood, with all the crap that has gone on down here over the years with recruiting and all, these games are not nearly as special to me as you might think." Referring to UK's reputation for putting less-than-outstanding public citizens on the team, Knight later said, "I like to think of C. M. Newton [University of Kentucky Athletic Director] as the school's director of corrections."

=== Notable games ===
- 1924: The Indiana Hoosiers and Kentucky Wildcats met for the first time on December 18, 1924, in the second game ever played at the newly opened Alumni Gymnasium on the University of Kentucky campus. Both teams were led by new coaches. The 1-1 Hoosiers were headed by first-year coach Everett Dean who would go on to compile a 162–93 record in 14 seasons at Indiana. Clarence Applegran, in his only season at Kentucky, coached a Wildcats team that was 1–0. Characterized in newspaper reports as a defensive game, IU held onto a five-point halftime lead to beat Kentucky 20–18. Indiana would eventually finish the 1924–1925 season 12–5 and the Wildcats 13–8. Alternating between Bloomington, Indiana and Lexington, Kentucky, the teams would meet each of the next three seasons with Indiana a double-digit victor in each game.
- 1940: The Indiana/Kentucky match-up resumed thirteen seasons later at the annual Sugar Bowl tournament in New Orleans before a record crowd of 7,500. Coached by Branch McCracken, the Hoosiers entered the game as the defending national champions with a record of 6–1. McCracken's team, who had just flown in from the West Coast after taking three out of four games from Stanford, California, USC, and UCLA, was described as being air sick. Adolph Rupp, destined to hold the title NCAA Division I men's basketball record-holder for victories, led a 5–2 Kentucky team that won the SEC men's basketball tournament and the Sugar Bowl tournament the previous season. Curly Armstrong and Bill Menke each scored 14 to help Indiana hold off the Wildcats, 48–45.
- December 12, 1970: UK 95, IU 93 (OT)
- December 17, 1971: IU 90, UK 89 (2 OT)
- March 17, 1973: IU 72, UK 65: This match-up occurred in the NCAA tournament Mideast Regional Final in Nashville, Tennessee.
- December 7, 1974: IU 98, UK 74: Indiana and Kentucky met in the regular season in Bloomington. During the game, Knight hit Kentucky coach Joe B. Hall in the back of the head. Hall later said, "It publicly humiliated me".
- March 22, 1975: UK 92, IU 90: Indiana and Kentucky met in the 1975 NCAA Mideast Regional Final in Dayton, Ohio. The Hoosiers were ranked first in the United States, while Kentucky was ranked number five. Kentucky won 92–90. It is on USA Today's list of the greatest NCAA tournament games of all time.
- December 15, 1979: UK 69, IU 58: In 1979 the number one ranked Indiana traveled to Rupp Arena to take on 5th ranked Kentucky.
- March 24, 1983: UK 64, IU 59: This game occurred in the NCAA tournament Mideast Regional semifinal.
- December 8, 1984: IU 81, UK 68
- December 5, 1987: UK 82, IU 76 (OT)
- December 2, 1989: IU 71, UK 69
- December 7, 1991: UK 76, IU 74: 14th-ranked Kentucky beat 9th-ranked Indiana 76–74 under coach Rick Pitino.
- January 3, 1993: UK 81, IU 78: 4th ranked Indiana played 3rd ranked Kentucky in Louisville. Had Indiana won the game, it would have been Bob Knight's 600th career victory.
- December 4, 1993: IU 96, UK 84: Prior to this game Kentucky was ranked number one in the nation, but Indiana defeated the Wildcats. After the win, IU led the all-time series 20–17.
- December 7, 1996: UK 99, IU 65
- December 4, 1999: IU 83, UK 75
- December 21, 2002: UK 70, IU 64
- December 10, 2011: IU 73, UK 72: In 2011 Kentucky played Indiana in Bloomington. When Indiana won, Bob Kravitz said that it was "a day when Hoosier Hysteria was restored to something akin to its former glory." ESPN commentator Dick Vitale said it was the "best game of the year."
- March 23, 2012: UK 102, IU 90: Kentucky was again ranked number one going into the South Regional semifinals of the 2012 NCAA Division I men's basketball tournament at Atlanta's Georgia Dome and was matched against #4 seed Indiana, who was responsible for one of UK's two defeats that season. Led by Michael Kidd-Gilchrist (24 points) and Doron Lamb (21 points) and the defense of Anthony Davis (9 points), Kentucky defeated Indiana by a score of 102–90 to advance to the Regional Finals on their way to their eighth NCAA Championship.
- March 19, 2016: IU 73, UK 67: Kentucky took on 5th-seeded Indiana in the Round of 32 but Indiana prevailed. Indiana would go on to lose to North Carolina in the Sweet 16.
- December 13, 2025: Kentucky 72, IU 60: In their first matchup since renewing their annual rivalry, Kentucky defeated Indiana on its home court. The Wildcats erased a 7-point halftime deficit, outscoring the Hoosiers by 19 in the second half to earn the program's first marquee win of the 2025–2026 season.

=== 21st century ===
In 2011, Kentucky coach John Calipari considered ending one of Kentucky's games against Louisville, North Carolina, or Indiana. Calipari and Indiana head coach Tom Crean were unable to resolve the issue of whether to play future games on the respective teams' home courts or at neutral sites. This prompted the schools to cancel their annual meeting for the 2012–13 season. After IU athletic director Fred Glass reopened negotiations on May 10, 2012, Calipari rejected Glass's compromise to play two games at Lucas Oil Stadium and one game apiece at Assembly Hall and Rupp Arena, thus ending the series.

The series restarted in 2025, with Kentucky winning on December 13, and Indiana winning in November 2026.

=== Game results ===
Ranking of the team at the time of the game by the AP poll are shown by the team name.

| Kentucky victories | Indiana victories | Tie games |

| No. | Date | Location | Winner | Score |
|---|---|---|---|---|
| 1 | December 18, 1924 | Alumni Gymnasium | Indiana | 34–23 |
| 2 | January 5, 1926 | Men's Gymnasium | Indiana | 34–23 |
| 3 | December 21, 1926 | Alumni Gymnasium | Indiana | 38–19 |
| 4 | February 4, 1928 | Men's Gymnasium | Indiana | 48–29 |
| 5 | December 30, 1940 | Municipal Auditorium | Indiana | 48–45 |
| 6 | December 23, 1942 | Jefferson County Armory | Indiana | 58–52 |
| 7 | December 11, 1943 | Jefferson County Armory | Kentucky | 66–41 |
| 8 | December 16, 1944 | Jefferson County Armory | Kentucky | 61–43 |
| 9 | December 18, 1965 | Alumni Gymnasium | Kentucky | 91–56 |
| 10 | December 13, 1969 | Alumni Gymnasium | No. 1 Kentucky | 109–92 |
| 11 | December 12, 1970 | New Field House | No. 5 Kentucky | 95–93^{OT} |
| 12 | December 17, 1971 | Freedom Hall | Indiana | 90–89^{OT} |
| 13 | December 9, 1972 | Assembly Hall | Indiana | 64–58 |
| 14 | March 17, 1973^{A} | Memorial Gymnasium | No. 6 Indiana | 72–65 |
| 15 | December 8, 1973 | Freedom Hall | No. 3 Indiana | 77–68 |
| 16 | December 7, 1974 | Assembly Hall | No. 3 Indiana | 98–74 |
| 17 | March 22, 1975^{B} | UD Arena | No. 5 Kentucky | 92–90 |
| 18 | December 15, 1975 | Freedom Hall | No. 1 Indiana | 77–68^{OT} |
| 19 | December 6, 1976 | Assembly Hall | No. 5 Kentucky | 66–51 |
| 20 | December 5, 1977 | Rupp Arena | No. 1 Kentucky | 78–64 |
| 21 | December 16, 1978 | Assembly Hall | No. 8 Indiana | 68–67^{OT} |
| 22 | December 15, 1979 | Rupp Arena | No. 5 Kentucky | 69–58 |
| 23 | December 6, 1980 | Assembly Hall | No. 2 Kentucky | 68–66 |
| 24 | December 8, 1981 | Rupp Arena | No. 2 Kentucky | 85–69 |
| 25 | December 22, 1982 | Assembly Hall | No. 5 Indiana | 62–59 |
| 26 | March 24, 1983^{C} | Stokely Athletic Center | No. 12 Kentucky | 64–59 |
| 27 | December 3, 1983 | Rupp Arena | No. 1 Kentucky | 59–54 |
| 28 | December 8, 1984 | Assembly Hall | No. 11 Indiana | 81–68 |
| 29 | December 12, 1985 | Rupp Arena | No. 9 Kentucky | 63–58 |
| 30 | December 6, 1986 | Assembly Hall | No. 3 Indiana | 71–66 |

| No. | Date | Location | Winner | Score |
|---|---|---|---|---|
| 31 | December 5, 1987 | Hoosier Dome | No. 2 Kentucky | 82–76 |
| 32 | December 20, 1988 | Rupp Arena | Indiana | 75–52 |
| 33 | December 2, 1989 | Hoosier Dome | No. 14 Indiana | 71–69 |
| 34 | December 18, 1990 | Assembly Hall | No.7 Indiana | 87–84 |
| 35 | December 7, 1991 | Hoosier Dome | No. 14 Kentucky | 76–74 |
| 36 | January 3, 1993 | Freedom Hall | Kentucky | 81–78 |
| 37 | December 4, 1993 | Hoosier Dome | No. 21 Indiana | 96–84 |
| 38 | December 4, 1994 | Freedom Hall | No. 7 Kentucky | 73–70 |
| 39 | December 2, 1995 | RCA Dome | No. 1 Kentucky | 89–82 |
| 40 | December 7, 1996 | Freedom Hall | No. 6 Kentucky | 99–65 |
| 41 | December 6, 1997 | RCA Dome | No. 1 Kentucky | 75–72 |
| 42 | December 8, 1998 | Freedom Hall | No. 8 Kentucky | 70–61^{OT} |
| 43 | December 4, 1999 | RCA Dome | No. 23 Indiana | 83–75 |
| 44 | December 22, 2000 | Freedom Hall | Kentucky | 88–74 |
| 45 | December 22, 2001 | RCA Dome | No. 7 Kentucky | 66–52 |
| 46 | December 21, 2002 | Freedom Hall | No. 16 Kentucky | 70–64 |
| 47 | December 20, 2003 | RCA Dome | No. 2 Kentucky | 80–41 |
| 48 | December 11, 2004 | Freedom Hall | No. 10 Kentucky | 73–58 |
| 49 | December 10, 2005 | RCA Dome | No. 18 Indiana | 79–53 |
| 50 | December 9, 2006 | Rupp Arena | Kentucky | 59–54 |
| 51 | December 8, 2007 | Assembly Hall | No. 15 Indiana | 70–51 |
| 52 | December 13, 2008 | Rupp Arena | Kentucky | 72–54 |
| 53 | December 12, 2009 | Assembly Hall | No. 4 Kentucky | 90–73 |
| 54 | December 11, 2010 | Rupp Arena | No. 17 Kentucky | 81–62 |
| 55 | December 10, 2011 | Assembly Hall | Indiana | 73–72 |
| 56 | March 23, 2012^{D} | Georgia Dome | No. 1 Kentucky | 102–90 |
| 57 | March 19, 2016^{E} | Wells Fargo Arena | No. 14 Indiana | 73–67 |
| 58 | December 13, 2025 | Rupp Arena | Kentucky | 72–60 |
| 59 | November 20, 2026 | Lucas Oil Stadium | Indiana | 90–76 |
Series: Kentucky leads 33–26

==== Notes ====
^{A} 1973 NCAA Elite Eight
^{B} 1975 NCAA Elite Eight
^{C} 1983 NCAA Sweet Sixteen
^{D} 2012 NCAA Sweet Sixteen
^{E} 2016 NCAA round of 32

=== Wins by location ===
| Category | Indiana | Kentucky |
|---|---|---|
| Atlanta, GA | 0 | 1 |
| Bloomington, IN | 11 | 4 |
| Dayton, OH | 0 | 1 |
| Des Moines, IA | 1 | 0 |
| Indianapolis, IN | 5 | 6 |
| Knoxville, TN | 0 | 1 |
| Lexington, KY | 3 | 10 |
| Louisville, KY | 4 | 9 |
| Nashville, TN | 1 | 0 |
| New Orleans, LA | 1 | 0 |

=== Wins by site ===
| Category | Indiana | Kentucky |
|---|---|---|
| Alumni Gymnasium | 2 | 2 |
| Assembly Hall | 10 | 2 |
| Freedom Hall | 3 | 7 |
| Georgia Dome | 0 | 1 |
| Hoosier Dome; RCA Dome | 4 | 6 |
| Jefferson County Armory | 1 | 2 |
| Lucas Oil Stadium | 1 | 0 |
| Memorial Gymnasium | 1 | 0 |
| Men's Gymnasium | 2 | 0 |
| Municipal Auditorium | 1 | 0 |
| New Field House | 0 | 1 |
| Rupp Arena | 1 | 8 |
| Stokely Athletic Center | 0 | 1 |
| UD Arena | 0 | 1 |
| Wells Fargo Arena | 1 | 0 |

=== Wins by decade ===
| Indiana advantage | Kentucky advantage | Tie |

| Decade | Indiana | Kentucky |
|---|---|---|
| 1920 | 4 | 0 |
| 1940 | 2 | 2 |
| 1960 | 0 | 2 |
| 1970 | 7 | 5 |
| 1980 | 5 | 6 |
| 1990 | 3 | 7 |
| 2000 | 2 | 8 |
| 2010 | 2 | 2 |
| 2020 | 1 | 1 |
| Total | 26 | 33 |

== Women's basketball ==
The Indiana Hoosiers women's basketball team played its first varsity season in 1971–72, and Kentucky Wildcats women's basketball had its first varsity season in 1974–75. As of the 2021–22 season, Kentucky leads the all-time series 14–13, with the most recent match being an 88–67 win for No. 8 Indiana over No. 13 Kentucky in Bloomington on November 14, 2021.

The first women's basketball game between Indiana and Kentucky was on January 24, 1974, and an 88–54 win for Indiana, the season before Kentucky women's basketball became varsity. The Indiana-Kentucky women's basketball series was played annually on a home-and-home basis from the 1976–77 to 1990–91 seasons, except for the December 30, 1990 game played in Reno, Nevada for the New Year's Classic tournament hosted by the University of Nevada, Reno, and again from 1993–94 to 1997–98. The series then went on a nine-year pause until the championship round of the Women's Sports Foundation Tournament on November 12, 2006, a 54–51 Indiana win over No. 15 Kentucky in Lexington. This was Indiana's sixth straight win in the series dating back to 1993.

After a 14-year hiatus, the series resumed when Kentucky announced on November 19, 2020, nearly a week before the delayed start of the 2020–21 season, the addition of a December 5 home game vs. Indiana. Kentucky scheduled this game to make up for COVID-19 protocols preventing the annual game vs. in-state rival Louisville from being hosted that season. In the game, No. 11 Kentucky rallied from down 14 to beat No. 13 Indiana 72–68, Kentucky's first win over Indiana in 30 years.

In the 2022 NCAA Division I women's basketball tournament, Indiana got the No. 3 seed of the Bridgeport region and hosted the first two rounds. Kentucky got the No. 6 seed. Had both teams won their first-round games, they would have met for the third time in 16 months in the second round. On March 19, Indiana beat No. 14 seed Charlotte 85–51, Kentucky lost to No. 11 seed Princeton 69–62, thus denying another Indiana–Kentucky matchup in the second round.

== Baseball ==
The first Indiana–Kentucky baseball game took place on April 16, 1903, an 8–5 win for Kentucky. As of the 2023 season, Kentucky has a 26–21 series lead. In the 2023 NCAA Tournament, Kentucky was the no. 12 national seed and hosted a double-elimination regional bracket in Lexington, with Indiana assigned to the Lexington regional bracket. Indiana won 5–3 on June 3, but Kentucky won 16–6 on June 4 to force a regional final June 5.
