= Jack Harbaugh =

American football player and coach (born 1939)

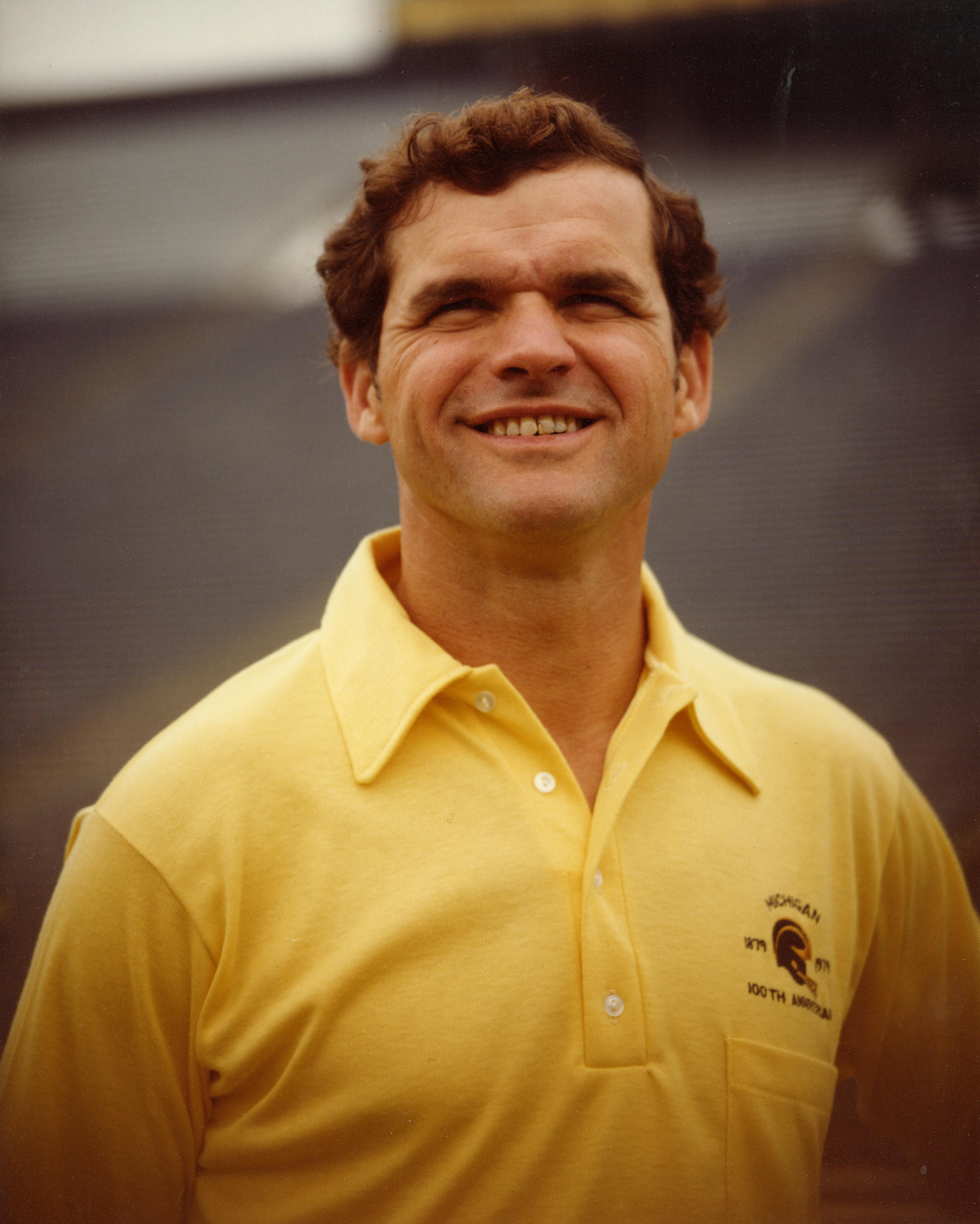
- Harbaugh with Michigan in 1979

Biographical details
- Born: June 28, 1939 (age 87); Crestline, Ohio, U.S.

Playing career
- 1957–1960: Bowling Green
- Position: Halfback

Coaching career (HC unless noted)
- 1962–1963: Perrysburg HS (OH) (assistant)
- 1964–1965: Eaton HS (OH)
- 1966: Xenia HS (OH)
- 1967: Morehead State (assistant)
- 1968–1970: Bowling Green (assistant)
- 1971–1973: Iowa (assistant)
- 1973–1979: Michigan (DB)
- 1980–1981: Stanford (DC)
- 1982–1986: Western Michigan
- 1987–1988: Pittsburgh (assistant)
- 1989–2002: Western Kentucky
- 2004–2006: San Diego (RB)
- 2009: Stanford (RB)
- 2023: Michigan (AHC)

Head coaching record
- Overall: 116–95–3 (college)

Accomplishments and honors

Championships
- Head coach: NCAA Division I-AA (2002); OVC (2000); GFC (2002); Western Ohio League (1966); Assistant: NCAA FBS (CFP) (2023)

Awards
- AFCA NCAA Division I-AA COY (2002); OVC Coach of the Year (2000)

Jack Avon Harbaugh (born June 28, 1939) is an American former college football coach and player. He served as the head football coach at Western Michigan University from 1982 to 1986 and Western Kentucky University from 1989 to 2002, compiling a career college football head coaching record of 116–95–3. In his final year at Western Kentucky, he led the 2002 Hilltoppers to an NCAA Division I-AA Football Championship title. In 2023, Harbaugh came out of retirement to become assistant head coach of the Michigan Wolverines under his son Jim (who was the suspended head coach at the time) and helped lead the team to win the 2024 College Football Playoff National Championship.

Harbaugh's sons, John and Jim, are the first pair of brothers to serve as head coaches in the NFL and the first pair of head coaching brothers to face off in a Super Bowl, doing so in February 2013.

== Early life ==
Harbaugh was born in Crestline, Ohio, to Marie Evelyn (née Fisher) and William Avon Harbaugh. He is of German and Irish descent. He graduated from Crestline High School in 1957. At Crestline, he was a four-year letterman in both football and baseball. He was an all-state quarterback and shortstop in his senior year. He was also a two-time letterman in basketball.

== Playing career ==
He played college football for the Bowling Green State University Falcons from 1957 to 1960, where he was a three-time letterman. In his junior year, the Falcons finished the season 9–0 and were named the small college division national champions. He was drafted in the 1961 AFL draft by the Buffalo Bills as a running back.

== Coaching career ==
Harbaugh began as an assistant coach to Jerry Nowak at Perrysburg High School in Perrysburg, Ohio, southwest of Toledo. Both sons were born while Harbaugh was in Perrysburg. In 1964, Harbaugh was the head coach of Eaton High School football team in Eaton, Ohio. His record was 5–4–1, their first winning season in many years. In 1965 the team went 6–4. In 1966, Harbaugh was the head coach of the Xenia High School football team in Xenia, Ohio. His record for the one year that he coached was 8–1–1. He received championship honors in the Western Ohio League and was named conference Coach of the Year.

Harbaugh served as an assistant in various college programs from 1968 to 1981.

From 1982 to 1986, he served as the head football coach at Western Michigan University and compiled a 25–27–3 record. From 1989 to 2002, he was the head football coach at Western Kentucky University. During his tenure with the Hilltoppers he posted a 91–68 record, including three 10-win seasons. The Hilltoppers were the only team to rank in the top 10 every year in rushing offense from 1991-2002. In 2002, the WKU squad won the NCAA Division I-AA national football championship.

After leaving Western Kentucky, Harbaugh served as an associate athletic director at Marquette University, Milwaukee, Wisconsin, where his son-in-law, Tom Crean, was the head coach of the men's basketball team. Harbaugh has also served as an assistant coach at Morehead State University, Bowling Green State University, the University of Iowa, the University of Michigan, Stanford University, the University of Pittsburgh, and the University of San Diego.

Harbaugh retired in 2006, but served as Stanford's running backs coach in the 2009 Sun Bowl under his son, Jim. Jack filled in for Willie Taggart, who had recently been hired as the new head football coach at WKU.

Following his son Jim's three-game suspension in 2023, Harbaugh unretired to serve as an assistant head coach for Michigan, and would wind up winning the 2024 College Football Playoff National Championship alongside his son.

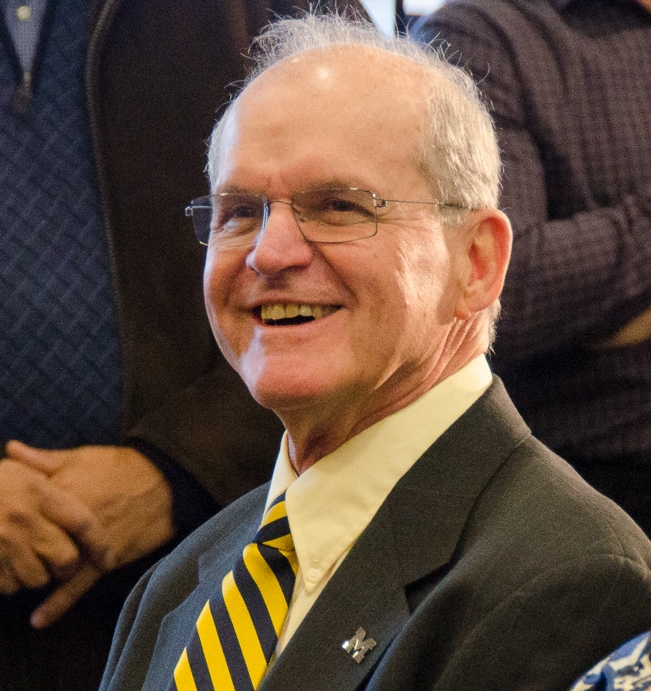
Harbaugh at his son Jim's introductory press conference as the head coach of the Michigan Wolverines.

== Personal life ==
Harbaugh married his wife, Jacqueline M. "Jackie" Cipiti, in 1961. They have three children: John, Jim, and Joani. Jack and Jackie settled in Mequon, Wisconsin, when he took the position as Associate Athletic Director for Marquette University in Milwaukee. Harbaugh is a member of the Bowling Green State University chapter of Phi Delta Theta fraternity.

Their two sons, New York Giants head coach John Harbaugh and Los Angeles Chargers head coach Jim Harbaugh, were the first pair of brothers to serve as head coaches in the National Football League (NFL). The brothers coached their teams in a game unofficially nicknamed the 'Harbaugh Bowl' and 'Har-bowl' on Thanksgiving Day 2011—one day before Jack and Jackie's fiftieth wedding anniversary—in which John's Baltimore Ravens beat Jim's San Francisco 49ers, 16–6. They faced each other again in a second 'Har-bowl' when Baltimore beat San Francisco on February 3, 2013, at Super Bowl XLVII in New Orleans by a score of 34–31. A year prior, the two brothers nearly faced off in Super Bowl XLVI, both playing in the conference championship game on January 22, 2012, however John's Ravens fell to the New England Patriots 23-20 in the AFC Championship Game before later the same day, Jim's 49ers lost in overtime to the eventual Super Bowl champion New York Giants 20-17 on the NFC Championship Game. Jim also played as quarterback at Michigan and for 15 seasons in the NFL for six different teams from 1987 to 2001 before entering coaching.

Their daughter Joani's husband, Tom Crean, has been the head men's basketball coach at Marquette, Indiana, and Georgia. They met while Jack was the head football coach at Western Kentucky University and Crean was an assistant basketball coach to Ralph Willard.

== Head coaching record ==
=== College ===
Year	Team	Overall	Conference	Standing	Bowl/playoffs	TSN^{#}
Western Michigan Broncos (Mid-American Conference) (1982–1986)
1982	Western Michigan	7–2–2	5–2–2	2nd		
1983	Western Michigan	6–5	4–5	6th		
1984	Western Michigan	5–6	3–6	T–8th		
1985	Western Michigan	4–6–1	4–4–1	T–4th		
1986	Western Michigan	3–8	3–5	8th		
Western Michigan:		25–27–3	19–22–3			
Western Kentucky Hilltoppers (NCAA Division I-AA Independent) (1989–1998)
1989	Western Kentucky	6–5				
1990	Western Kentucky	2–8				
1991	Western Kentucky	3–8				
1992	Western Kentucky	4–6				
1993	Western Kentucky	8–3				19
1994	Western Kentucky	5–6				
1995	Western Kentucky	2–8				
1996	Western Kentucky	7–4				
1997	Western Kentucky	10–2			L NCAA Division I-AA Quarterfinal	5
1998	Western Kentucky	7–4				19
Western Kentucky Hilltoppers (Ohio Valley Conference) (1999–2000)
1999	Western Kentucky	6–5	4–3	T–3rd		
2000	Western Kentucky	11–2	7–0	1st	L NCAA Division I-AA Quarterfinal	5
Western Kentucky Hilltoppers (Gateway Football Conference) (2001–2002)
2001	Western Kentucky	8–4	5–2	T–2nd	L NCAA Division I-AA First Round	12
2002	Western Kentucky	12–3	6–1	T–1st	W NCAA Division I-AA Championship	1
Western Kentucky:		91–68	22–6			
Total:		116–95–3				
National championship Conference title Conference division title or championship game berth
