= John Harbaugh =

American football coach (born 1962)

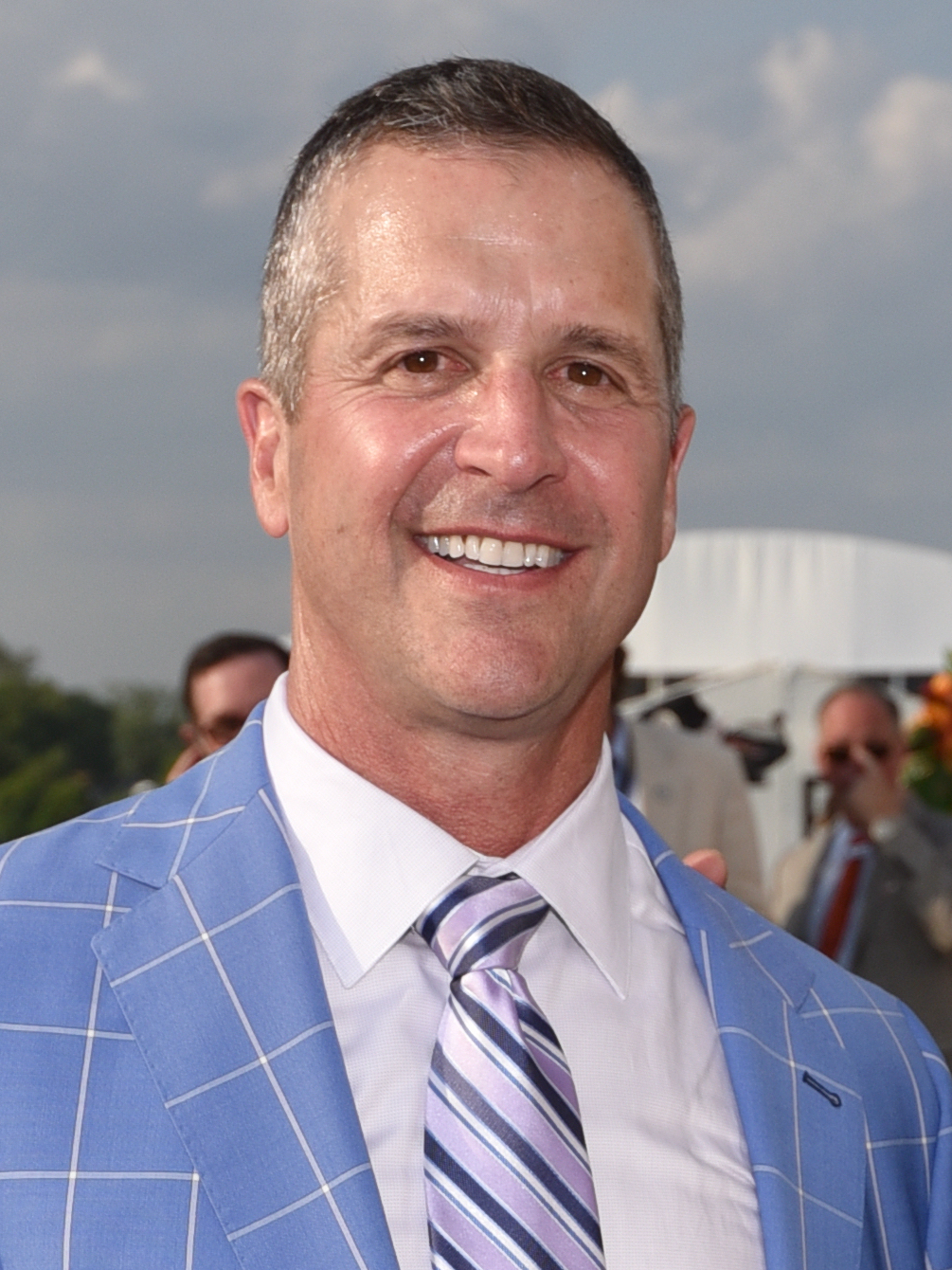
- Harbaugh in 2022

New York Giants
- Title: Head coach

Personal information
- Born: September 23, 1962 (age 64); Toledo, Ohio, U.S.

Career information
- Position: Safety
- High school: Pioneer (Ann Arbor, Michigan)
- College: Miami (OH) (1980–1983)

Career history
- Western Michigan (1984–1986) Running backs coach & outside linebackers coach; Pittsburgh (1987) Tight ends coach; Morehead State (1988) Special teams coach & secondary coach; Cincinnati (1989–1996) Special teams coordinator; Indiana (1997) Special teams coordinator & defensive backs coach; Philadelphia Eagles (1998–2007); Special teams coordinator (1998–2006); Defensive backs coach (2007); Baltimore Ravens (2008–2025) Head coach; New York Giants (2026–present) Head coach

Awards and highlights
- Super Bowl champion (XLVII); AP NFL Coach of the Year (2019); Greasy Neale Award (2019); NFL coaching record: Most road playoff wins: 8

Head coaching record
- Regular season: 185–116–1 (.614)
- Postseason: 13–11 (.542)
- Career: 198–127–1 (.609)
- Coaching profile at Pro Football Reference

John William Harbaugh (/ˈhɑːrbɔː/ HAR-baw; born September 23, 1962) is an American professional football coach who is the head coach for the New York Giants of the National Football League (NFL). He previously coached the defensive backs for the Philadelphia Eagles and served as their special teams coach for nine years. In 2008, Harbaugh was hired as the head coach of the Baltimore Ravens, serving in the role for 18 seasons. Harbaugh and his younger brother, former San Francisco 49ers and current Los Angeles Chargers head coach Jim Harbaugh, are the first pair of brothers in NFL history to serve as head coaches. Their father, Jack, served 45 years as a college defensive coach, an assistant coach, and a running backs coach. In the 2012 NFL season, John and the Ravens defeated Jim and the 49ers in Super Bowl XLVII.

Harbaugh led the Ravens to 193 wins (including playoffs) over his 18-season tenure, the third-most wins in the NFL over that span, and surpassed Brian Billick for the most wins by a head coach in Ravens franchise history. Harbaugh led the Ravens to 13 winning seasons with only three losing seasons. His 24 playoff game appearances are the second-most by any head coach in the NFL since 2008. Harbaugh is also the only head coach in NFL history to win a playoff game in six of the first seven seasons of a coaching career and has the most road playoff wins by a head coach (8). Outside of winning Super Bowl XLVII, he guided the Ravens to six AFC North division championships, four AFC Championship appearances, and a franchise-best 14–2 record in 2019. On January 6, 2026, Harbaugh was fired after 18 seasons as Ravens head coach. Two weeks later, he was hired as the Giants' head coach.

== Early life ==
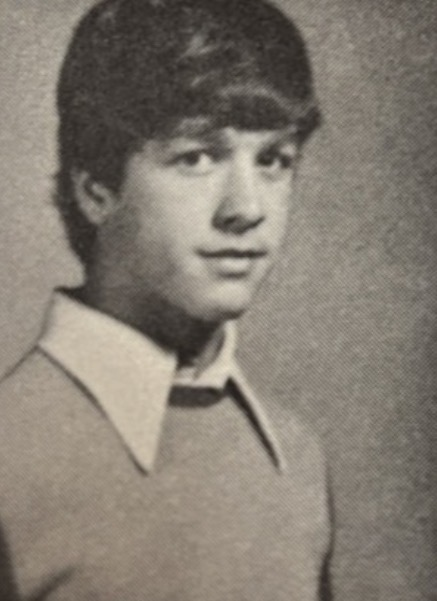
Harbaugh's 1976 junior high yearbook portrait

John Harbaugh was born in Toledo, Ohio, to Jackie Cipiti and Jack Harbaugh. He attended Tappan Junior High School, now Tappan Middle School, and graduated from Pioneer High School in Ann Arbor, Michigan, during which time Jack was an assistant under Bo Schembechler at the nearby University of Michigan. At Pioneer High School in Ann Arbor, Harbaugh was a standout three-sport athlete, competing in football, basketball, and track.

Harbaugh attended college and played varsity football as a defensive back at Miami University, where he graduated in 1984.

== Coaching career ==
=== Collegiate assistant ===
Interested in pursuing either law school or coaching after college, Harbaugh chose to enroll in classes at Western Michigan and work as a volunteer coach underneath his father, Jack, while he decided, turning down offers for coaching positions at Kansas and West Virginia. He continued to coach at Western Michigan through 1986 before going on to work in coaching positions at Pitt in 1987, Morehead State in 1988, Cincinnati from 1989 to 1996, and at Indiana in 1997.

=== Philadelphia Eagles (1998–2007) ===
He was first hired in the NFL in 1998 by the Philadelphia Eagles' then head coach Ray Rhodes, and was one of four assistant coaches retained by new head coach Andy Reid in 1999. As such, he is in the Sid Gillman coaching tree. In 2004, he was mentioned as a possible candidate to replace Gary Darnell as the head football coach at Western Michigan, where he had earned a master's degree and was an assistant football coach from 1984 to 1987.

In 2007, after serving as Eagles' special teams coach for nine years, he became their defensive backs coach. This fulfilled his request to head coach Reid and improved his chances of landing a head coaching job since executives at that time viewed special teams coaches as unqualified to move up to head coach.

=== Baltimore Ravens (2008–2025) ===
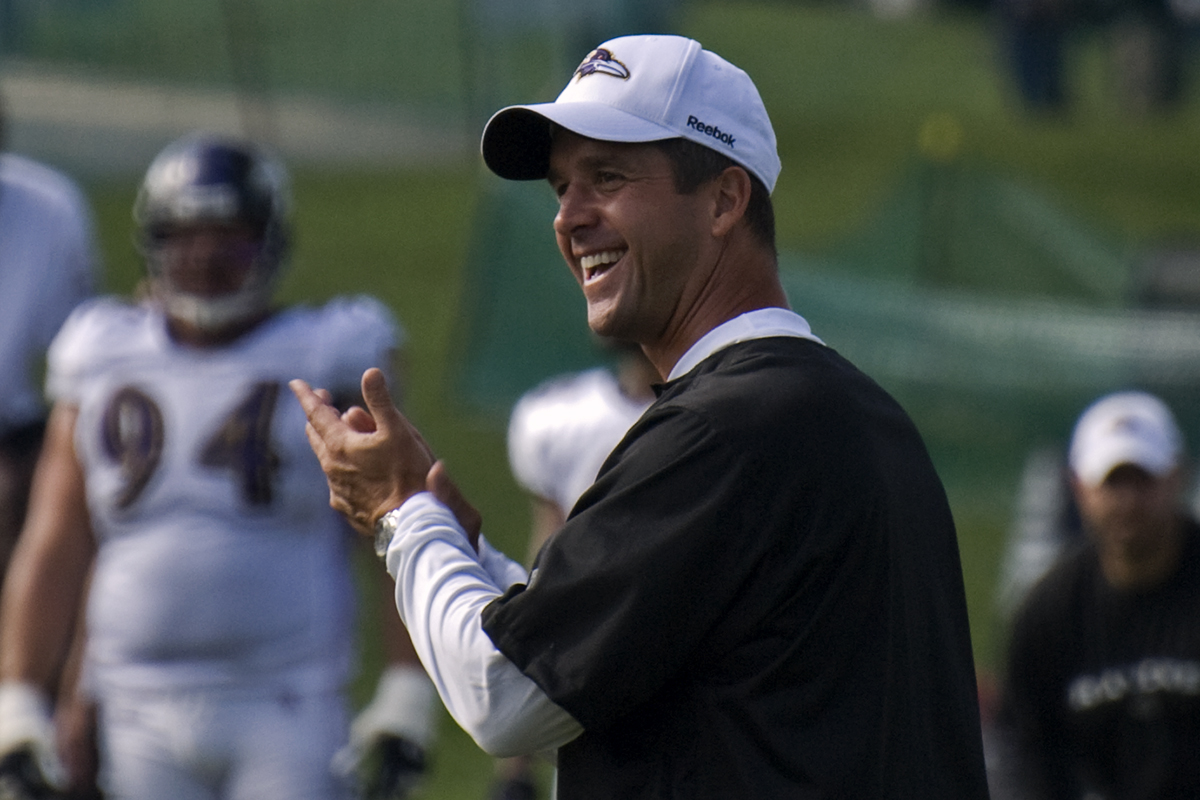
Harbaugh during Ravens training camp

On January 19, 2008, Harbaugh was hired as head coach of the Baltimore Ravens after Jason Garrett, the team's first choice, decided to stay with the Dallas Cowboys after receiving a raise and a promotion to assistant head coach.

At the time of his hiring, Harbaugh had no head coaching experience at any level, and had never been an offensive or defensive coordinator in the NFL. He impressed team owner Steve Bisciotti and Vice President of Player Personnel/General Manager Ozzie Newsome. New England Patriots head coach Bill Belichick also recommended Harbaugh to Bisciotti by phone during the interview process. On January 23, 2008, Harbaugh hired longtime NFL offensive coach (and former head coach) Cam Cameron as offensive coordinator.

==== Early years: 2008–2011 ====
On September 7, 2008, in his debut as a head coach, John and his Ravens beat the Cincinnati Bengals 17–10. In his first season as a head coach, Harbaugh guided the Ravens to an 11–5 regular season record, good enough to qualify them for the playoffs with a Wild Card berth. In the playoffs, he led the team to victories over the Miami Dolphins and Tennessee Titans before losing to the Pittsburgh Steelers in the AFC Championship Game.

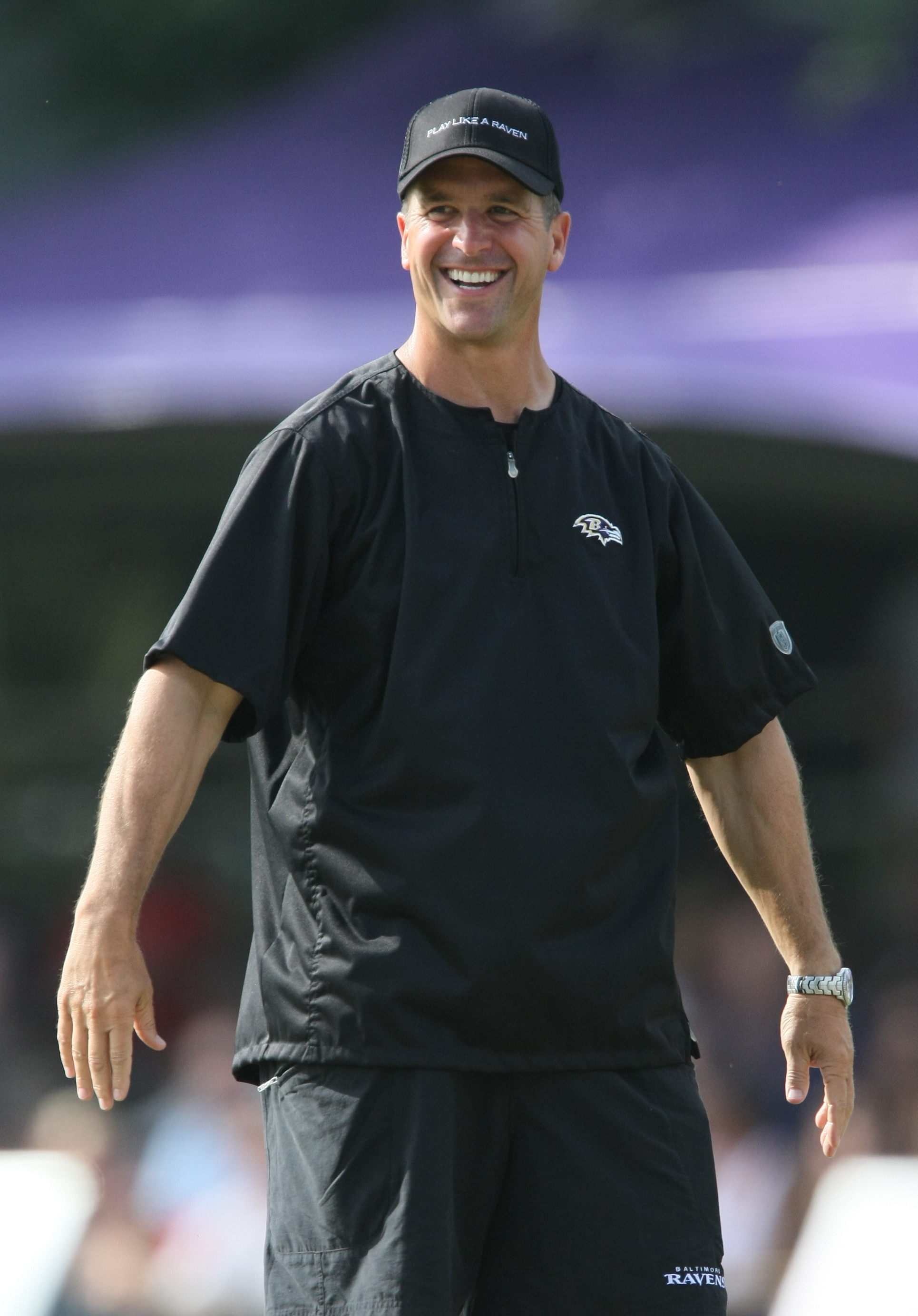
Harbaugh at training camp in 2009

Following the season, he named Greg Mattison as the defensive coordinator for the Ravens on January 26, 2009, replacing Rex Ryan who had left to take his first head coaching job (with the New York Jets). Mattison had served as linebacker coach and defensive coordinator for Harbaugh's father, Jack, at Western Michigan University from 1981 to 1986, when Harbaugh was a graduate assistant and assistant coach for his father.

In his second season as Ravens' head coach, Harbaugh once again led the team to the playoffs with a 9–7 record during the regular season and improved his playoff record to 3–1 with an upset 33–14 victory over the New England Patriots in the AFC Wild Card Round on January 10, 2010, before losing in the AFC Divisional Round 20–3 to the Indianapolis Colts.

In the 2010 season, Harbaugh led the Ravens to a 12–4 record and a Wild Card berth. They defeated the Kansas City Chiefs 30–7 in the Wild Card Round on January 9, 2011, before losing to the Pittsburgh Steelers 31–24 in the Divisional Round on January 15 after starting the second half with a 14-point lead.

Harbaugh signed a three-year extension on February 14, 2011, that kept him under contract through 2014. John faced his younger brother Jim in Week 12 (2011) on Thanksgiving Day when John's Ravens beat Jim's San Francisco 49ers 16–6. The Ravens finished the 2011 season with a 12–4 record, winning the AFC North and sweeping the Pittsburgh Steelers home and away. The Ravens defeated the Houston Texans 20–13 in the Divisional Round. The Ravens lost the AFC Championship to the New England Patriots after Lee Evans had a potential late game-winning pass knocked out of his hands by Patriots cornerback Sterling Moore and kicker Billy Cundiff missed a potential game-tying field goal.

Although they would meet in Super Bowl XLVII one year later, John and his younger brother Jim, at the time head coach of the San Francisco 49ers, nearly faced off in Super Bowl XLVI, both playing in the conference championship game on January 22, 2012, however following the Ravens’ defeat to New England in the AFC Championship Game, later that same day Jim's 49ers would lose in the NFC Championship Game to the eventual Super Bowl champion New York Giants 20–17 in overtime.

==== Super Bowl XLVII Champions: 2012 ====
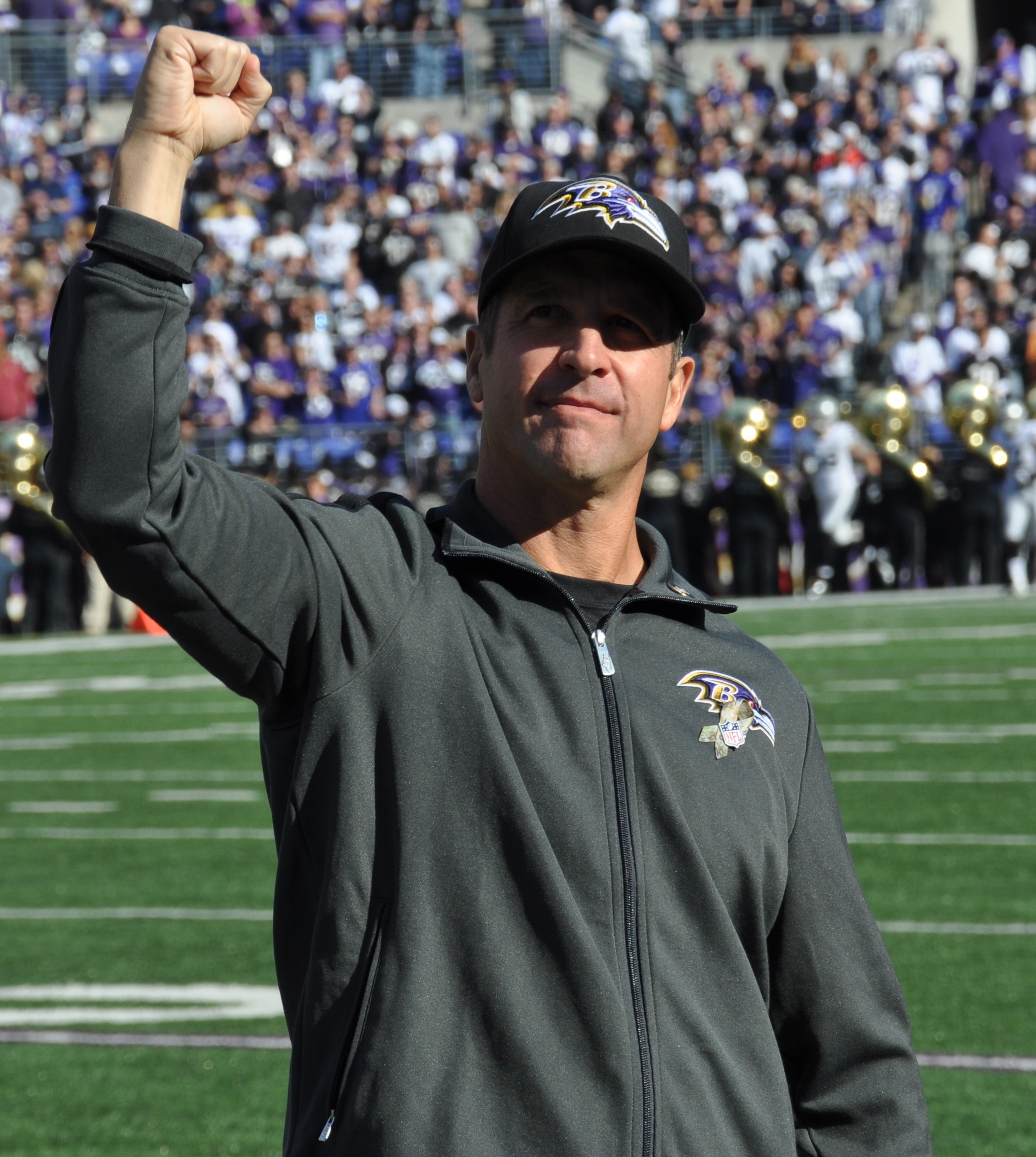
Harbaugh in 2012

Prior to the 2012 season, Harbaugh was awarded the third-highest honor within the Department of the Army Civilian Awards, the Outstanding Civilian Service Award, for substantial contributions to the U.S. Army community while serving as the Baltimore Ravens coach.

The 2012 Baltimore Ravens finished with a 10–6 record and won the AFC North. They defeated the Indianapolis Colts 24–9 in the Wild Card Round and the Denver Broncos 38–35 in the Divisional Round. They again met the New England Patriots in the AFC Championship (on January 20, 2013), got their revenge with a 28–13 victory (coming from behind with a 13–7 second half), and was the first time Tom Brady and Bill Belichick lost a home game after leading at halftime, giving John the opportunity to face brother Jim and the San Francisco 49ers in Super Bowl XLVII on February 3, 2013. Many have pegged Super Bowl XLVII as the "Harbowl". The Ravens were victorious, defeating the 49ers 34–31. Following the victory, John gave his entire staff replica Lombardi trophies to commemorate the victory.

==== Post-Super Bowl years with Flacco: 2013–2017 ====
On September 5, 2013, an hour before the Ravens played in the NFL regular season's opening game, it was reported that Harbaugh had signed a four-year contract extension in a deal that was reached "months ago." In the 2013 season, Harbaugh and the Ravens finished with an 8–8 record and missed the postseason.

Following the season, Harbaugh was inducted into Miami University's "Cradle of Coaches" in 2014.

In the 2014 season, Harbaugh and the Ravens finished with a 10–6 record and finished third in the AFC North. Despite the third-place finish, the Ravens made the postseason. In the Wild Card Round of the NFL playoffs, Harbaugh's Ravens beat the Pittsburgh Steelers in Heinz Field in a dominant 30–17 victory, which was the Ravens' first playoff victory against the Steelers in the history of the franchise. However, the next week, the Ravens lost 31–35 in the AFC Divisional round to the New England Patriots after the Ravens were unable to hold two separate 14-point leads. After the game, Harbaugh complained about the Patriots' uncommon but legal tactics of declaring receivers eligible and ineligible, saying "It was clearly deception."

In 2015, Harbaugh had his first losing season with the Ravens. The Ravens lost many close games and key players like Joe Flacco, Justin Forsett, Steve Smith Sr., Eugene Monroe, and Terrell Suggs all suffered season-ending injuries. They finished third in the AFC North with a 5–11 record.

In the 2016 season, Harbaugh and the Ravens finished with an 8–8 record and missed the postseason.

On August 28, 2017, Harbaugh signed a one-year contract extension, keeping him under contract through the 2019 season. In the 2017 season, the Ravens finished with a 9–7 record but missed the playoffs.

==== Emergence of Lamar Jackson and rebound: 2018–2021 ====
In the 2018 season, Harbaugh led the Ravens to a 10–6 record and won the AFC North. The season featured the emergence of Lamar Jackson as the quarterback of the team. The Ravens faced off against the Los Angeles Chargers in the Wild Card Round and lost 23–17.

On January 24, 2019, Harbaugh signed a four-year contract extension, keeping him under contract through the 2022 season.

External videos
- Harbaugh's 2019 Coach of the Year acceptance speech, Ravens video

During the season, Harbaugh led the Ravens to a 14–2 record in the regular season and secured the number 1 seed in the AFC playoffs. In the Divisional Round against the Tennessee Titans, the Ravens lost the game 28–12. For his work during the 2019 season, Harbaugh was honored as the AP NFL Coach of the Year.

In 2020, Harbaugh led the Ravens to a second-place in the AFC North with a record of 11–5, a Wild Card berth as the No. 5 seed, and their first playoff win since the 2014 season in a Wild Card win over the Tennessee Titans. The win not only helped the Ravens avenge their embarrassing playoff loss the year prior and brought reigning MVP Lamar Jackson to his first postseason win, it also broke the NFL record for most road playoff games won. In the Divisional Round, the Ravens fell to the Buffalo Bills 17–3.

In 2021, Harbaugh led the Ravens to an 8–3 start, and having the number 1 seed by Week 12. However, due to injuries and defensive struggles, the Ravens suffered a late-season collapse, falling to a six-game losing streak to end the season, finishing 8–9 and failing to qualify for playoff contention on the final week of the season to the Pittsburgh Steelers. It was the first time since 2015 that the Ravens suffered a losing season under Harbaugh, and the first time they finished in fourth place in the AFC North since 2007. Harbaugh came under scrutiny where he called a two-point conversion late in the fourth quarter twice to put the Ravens up by one, which both failed. Once against the Steelers in Week 13, and the other against the Packers.

==== Final years in Baltimore: 2022–2025 ====
On March 29, 2022, Harbaugh signed a three-year extension with the Ravens that ran through the 2025 season. December 11, 2022, marked the 32nd matchup between Harbaugh and Pittsburgh Steelers head coach Mike Tomlin, surpassing Curly Lambeau and Steve Owen for the second-most head-to-head matchups between head coaches in NFL history (the current record is held by Lambeau and George Halas with 49). The Ravens finished with a 10–7 record and earned a Wild Card berth. The Ravens fell to the Cincinnati Bengals in the Wild Card Round 24–17.

In 2023, Harbaugh led the Ravens to a 13–4 regular season mark and won the AFC North. The Ravens defeated the Texans 34–10 in the Divisional Round before falling to the Chiefs 17–10 in the AFC Championship.

In the 2024 season, Harbaugh led the Ravens to a 12–5 record and an AFC North title. The Ravens defeated the Steelers 28–14 in the Wild Card Round before falling to the Bills 27–25 in the Divisional Round.

On March 28, 2025, Harbaugh signed a three-year contract extension with the Ravens that ran through the 2028 season. Following the disappointing 2025 season in which the Ravens finished 8–9 and missed the playoffs, Harbaugh was fired by the Ravens on January 6, 2026. He had been the second-longest tenured head coach in the NFL at the time of his firing, trailing only Mike Tomlin of the Pittsburgh Steelers. Harbaugh finished his tenure in Baltimore with a 180–113 (.614) regular-season record and a 13–11 (.542) playoff record for a combined record of 193–124 (.609).

==== Overall in Baltimore ====
Harbaugh is the only head coach in NFL history to win a playoff game in each of his first five seasons, according to NFL Network.

In each of Harbaugh's first four seasons and again in 2014, every AFC Champion defeated the Ravens in the playoffs, though only the 2008 Pittsburgh Steelers and 2014 New England Patriots were able to go on and win the Super Bowl.

=== New York Giants (2026–present) ===
Following the Ravens firing him, Harbaugh became one of the top head coach candidates across the league. He had conversations with multiple teams to fill their head coach vacancies, which included the New York Giants, Atlanta Falcons, Tennessee Titans, Las Vegas Raiders, Arizona Cardinals, and Cleveland Browns. He narrowed his search down to the Giants, Falcons, and Titans. On January 20, 2026, the Giants officially announced Harbaugh, who signed a five-year contract, as the franchise's 21st head coach. In his introductory press conference, it was confirmed that Harbaugh only reports to owner John Mara with general manager Joe Schoen confirming he has no authority over Harbaugh.

== Head coaching record ==
Team	Year	Regular season					Postseason			
Team	Year	Won	Lost	Ties	Win %	Finish	Won	Lost	Win %	Result
BAL	2008	11	5	0	.688	2nd in AFC North	2	1	.667	Lost to Pittsburgh Steelers in AFC Championship Game
BAL	2009	9	7	0	.563	2nd in AFC North	1	1	.500	Lost to Indianapolis Colts in AFC Divisional Game
BAL	2010	12	4	0	.750	2nd in AFC North	1	1	.500	Lost to Pittsburgh Steelers in AFC Divisional Game
BAL	2011	12	4	0	.750	1st in AFC North	1	1	.500	Lost to New England Patriots in AFC Championship Game
BAL	2012	10	6	0	.625	1st in AFC North	4	0	1.000	Super Bowl XLVII champions
BAL	2013	8	8	0	.500	3rd in AFC North	—	—	—	—
BAL	2014	10	6	0	.625	3rd in AFC North	1	1	.500	Lost to New England Patriots in AFC Divisional Game
BAL	2015	5	11	0	.313	3rd in AFC North	—	—	—	—
BAL	2016	8	8	0	.500	2nd in AFC North	—	—	—	—
BAL	2017	9	7	0	.563	2nd in AFC North	—	—	—	—
BAL	2018	10	6	0	.625	1st in AFC North	0	1	.000	Lost to Los Angeles Chargers in AFC Wild Card Game
BAL	2019	14	2	0	.875	1st in AFC North	0	1	.000	Lost to Tennessee Titans in AFC Divisional Game
BAL	2020	11	5	0	.688	2nd in AFC North	1	1	.500	Lost to Buffalo Bills in AFC Divisional Game
BAL	2021	8	9	0	.471	4th in AFC North	—	—	—	—
BAL	2022	10	7	0	.588	2nd in AFC North	0	1	.000	Lost to Cincinnati Bengals in AFC Wild Card Game
BAL	2023	13	4	0	.765	1st in AFC North	1	1	.500	Lost to Kansas City Chiefs in AFC Championship Game
BAL	2024	12	5	0	.706	1st in AFC North	1	1	.500	Lost to Buffalo Bills in AFC Divisional Game
BAL	2025	8	9	0	.471	2nd in AFC North	—	—	—	—
BAL total		180	113	0	.614		13	11	.542	
NYG	2026	5	3	1	.611	TBD in NFC East	—	—	—	
NYG total		5	3	1	.611		0	0	–	
Total		185	116	1	.614		13	11	.542	

== Coaching tree ==
Harbaugh has served under eight head coaches:

- Jack Harbaugh, Western Michigan (1984–1987)
- Mike Gottfried, Pittsburgh (1987)
- Bill Baldridge, Morehead State (1988)
- Tim Murphy, Cincinnati (1989–1993)
- Rick Minter, Cincinnati (1994–1996)
- Cam Cameron, Indiana (1997)
- Ray Rhodes, Philadelphia Eagles (1998)
- Andy Reid, Philadelphia Eagles (1999–2007)

Twelve of Harbaugh's assistants have been hired as head coaches in the NFL or NCAA:

- Rex Ryan, New York Jets (2009–2014), Buffalo Bills (2015–2016)
- Hue Jackson, Oakland Raiders (2011), Cleveland Browns (2016–2018)
- Chuck Pagano, Indianapolis Colts (2012–2017)
- Jim Caldwell, Detroit Lions (2014–2017) (Note: Caldwell had already served as a head coach in the NFL with the Indianapolis Colts)
- Mike Pettine, Cleveland Browns (2014–2015)
- Gary Kubiak, Denver Broncos (2015–2016) (Note: Kubiak had already served as a head coach in the NFL with the Houston Texans)
- Vic Fangio, Denver Broncos (2019–2021)
- Thomas Hammock, Northern Illinois (2019–2025)
- David Culley, Houston Texans (2021)
- Mike Macdonald, Seattle Seahawks (2024–present)
- Jesse Minter, Baltimore Ravens (2026–present)
- Todd Monken, Cleveland Browns (2026–present)

== Personal life ==
Harbaugh is Catholic. He is married to Ingrid Harbaugh, and they have one daughter, Alison. Alison played lacrosse for the University of Notre Dame during the 2020 to 2024 collegiate seasons, and the University of South Florida for their inaugural season in 2025.

Harbaugh's younger brother, Jim, a former NFL quarterback, has been the head football coach of the Los Angeles Chargers since 2024. He was formerly the head coach for the Michigan Wolverines from 2015 to 2023. Their father, Jack, is a former head football coach at Western Michigan University and Western Kentucky University. John's sister, Joani, is married to Tom Crean, the former head men's basketball coach at Marquette University, Indiana University and the University of Georgia. John was roommates with Brian Pillman of professional wrestling fame while in college at Miami University in Ohio.
