= Tom Crean (basketball) =

American college basketball coach (born 1966)

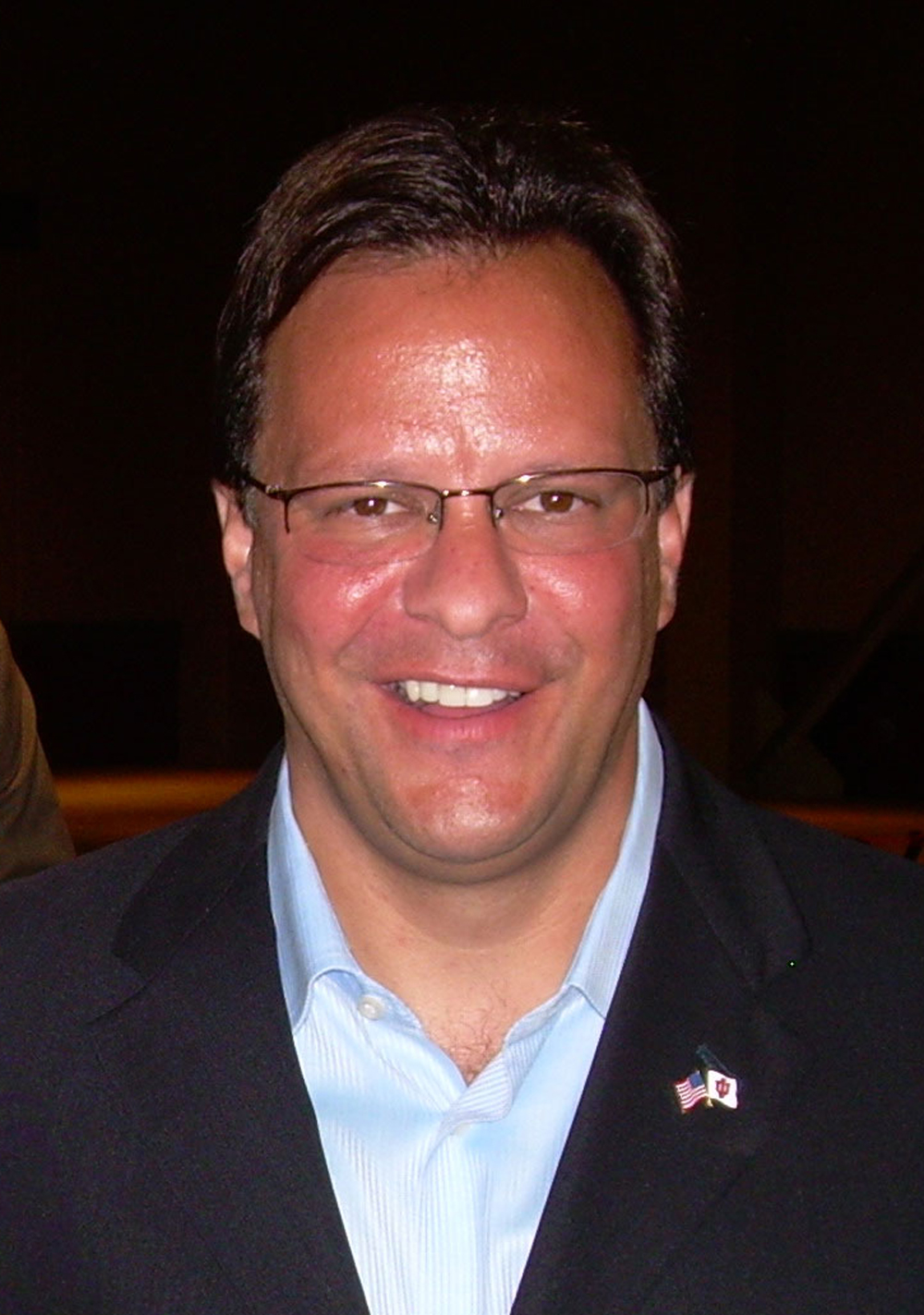
- Crean in 2012

Biographical details
- Born: March 25, 1966 (age 60); Mount Pleasant, Michigan, U.S.
- Education: Central Michigan ('89)

Coaching career (HC unless noted)
- 1987–1989: Alma (assistant)
- 1989–1990: Michigan State (GA)
- 1990–1994: Western Kentucky (assistant)
- 1994–1995: Pittsburgh (assistant)
- 1995–1999: Michigan State (assistant)
- 1999–2008: Marquette
- 2008–2017: Indiana
- 2018–2022: Georgia

Head coaching record
- Overall: 403–306 (.568)
- Tournaments: 11–9 (NCAA Division I); 2–3 (NIT)

Accomplishments and honors

Championships
- NCAA Division I Regional – Final Four (2003); C-USA regular season (2003); 2 Big Ten regular season (2013, 2016)

Awards
- Clair Bee Coach of the Year (2003); 2× C-USA Coach of the Year (2002, 2003); Big Ten Coach of the Year (2016)

Thomas Aaron Crean (born March 25, 1966) is an American college basketball coach and sportscaster. He was the head coach for the University of Georgia men's basketball team. Crean was previously the head coach of Indiana University. Prior to that, he served as head coach at Marquette University (1999–2008), where his team reached the 2003 NCAA Final Four. Crean currently works as an analyst for college basketball coverage on both ESPN and NBC Sports, working in both a color commentator role and a studio analyst contributing to halftime and between-games coverage. He has also worked as a color commentator in the NBA Summer League in 2025, also for ESPN.

Crean's basketball philosophy emphasizes fast breaks and transition offense. His guidance of the Indiana program to success from "unthinkable depths" was regarded as one of the most remarkable rebuilding projects in NCAA basketball history. In 2012, he was named the mid-season Jim Phelan National Coach of the Year, the Sporting News Big Ten Coach of the Year, and the ESPN.com National Coach of the Year. In 2016, Crean was named by the coaches and media the Big Ten Coach of the Year after coaching Indiana to their second outright Big Ten regular-season championship in four years.

== Personal life ==
Crean was born and raised in Mount Pleasant, Michigan, where he played basketball for four years. According to Crean, "I didn't play a lot, although my coach called me his biggest tool, but I knew I wanted to coach." While a student at Central Michigan University, Crean was an assistant coach at Mount Pleasant High School for five seasons, and at Alma College. Crean received his bachelor's degree in parks-and-recreation studies from Central Michigan in 1989. Crean is married to Joani Harbaugh, whom he met while an assistant to Ralph Willard at Western Kentucky University (WKU) through a mutual friend, Ron Burns, at a gym where she was working as an aerobics instructor. A member of the Harbaugh family, her father, Jack Harbaugh, was the head football coach at WKU at the time Crean was an assistant basketball coach there. She is also the sister of the first pair of brothers in NFL history to serve as head coaches: New York Giants head football coach John Harbaugh and Los Angeles Chargers head football coach Jim Harbaugh. Crean and his wife have three children: Megan, Riley, and Ainsley. Riley was a right handed pitcher for the Georgia Bulldogs baseball team in 2019, and is currently Assistant Coach for the Orlando Magic. Crean is a Christian.

== Assistant coaching career ==
Crean spent two stints at Michigan State, first during the 1989-1990 season as a graduate assistant under then head coach Jud Heathcote at the behest of then assistant coach Tom Izzo, whom Crean had befriended on the summer camp circuit. From 1990 to 1994 Crean served as the associate head coach under Ralph Willard at Western Kentucky. When Willard left Western Kentucky to become head coach at Pittsburgh in 1994, Crean was considered to replace him as head coach. Ultimately Crean followed Willard to Pittsburgh, serving as associate head coach for one year.

In 1995, Crean returned to Michigan State as assistant coach under the leadership of Tom Izzo. Izzo and Crean became such good friends that Crean lived in Izzo's house and Izzo was an usher in Crean's wedding. According to Crean at the time, "It was a great opportunity for me to go back home. We've been friends a long time. I don't think I would have left Ralph for anything else." During this period Crean served at various times as recruiting coordinator and, for the last two seasons, associate head coach.

== Marquette University ==
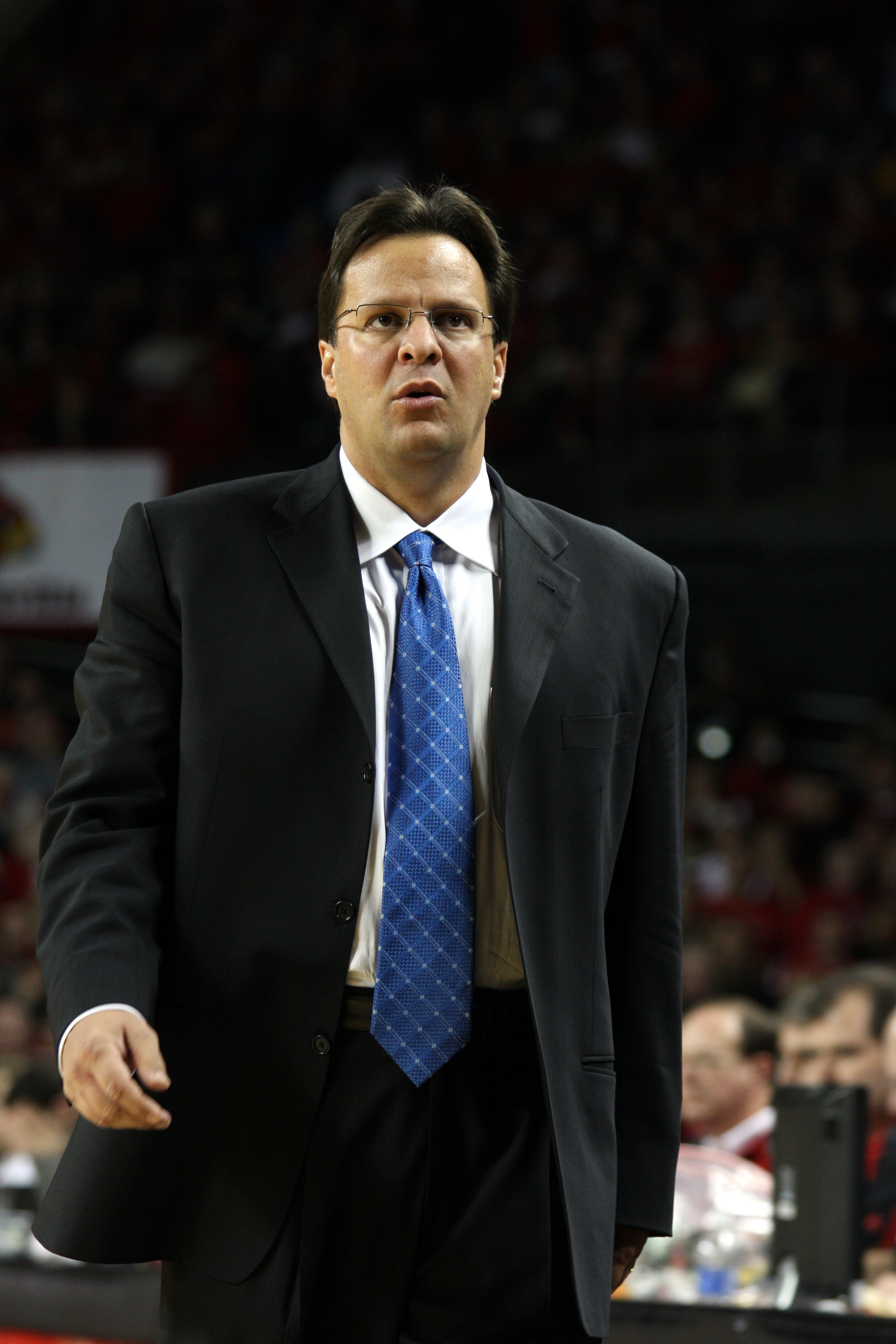
Crean on January 17, 2007 coaching at Freedom Hall

On March 30, 1999, Crean was named head coach at Marquette University. According to Crean, "Once Marquette became available, that's where my sights were. I had unbelievable respect for the tradition and the name. When I thought of Marquette, I thought of a true basketball school and to me that had a lot to do with it." Crean immediately made a number of changes at Marquette, creating a new team image by increasing the significance of the team's media day and instituting a "Midnight Madness" event commonly held by schools on the night teams are allowed to begin practice. Crean's first recruiting class was considered by experts to be among the top twenty in the country, Marquette's first in a long time.

Over his final seven seasons at Marquette, Crean compiled a record of 160-68 (.702). The 2002-03 season was one of the best in Marquette history. The team made a Final Four appearance for the first time since their 1977 NCAA Championship. Crean has referred to the team's run as "one of the greatest four or five days of my life."

Later that year, Marquette accepted an offer to leave Conference USA for the Big East Conference after the 2004–2005 season. Big East commissioner Mike Tranghese cited his friendship with Crean as contributing to the invitation, saying, "That, to me, was one of the great appeals, to get Tommy as well as Marquette into the league."

== Indiana University ==
"The tradition at Indiana could be stacked up against the tradition of any other college sports team anywhere because of everything that has gone on here, in the sense of how many players have played here, how many championships have been won here. The players were household names to me, so it's very, very easy for me to promote that and to want to be a part of that and to welcome that. That's our lifeline ... The tradition is what Indiana stands for and what I want it to stand for, and so we want to reward that and embrace that at every possible turn."

— Tom Crean, 2008

On April 1, 2008, Crean was hired as head coach of the Indiana Hoosiers, succeeding interim head coach Dan Dakich. Dakich had replaced former coach Kelvin Sampson, who resigned after NCAA recruiting violations. Between Crean's hiring and the start of the 2008–09 season, freshman Eric Gordon opted to leave early for the NBA and star forward DJ White graduated. Two players kicked off the team by Dakich were not allowed back by Crean, one was dismissed by Crean and two transferred. As a result, Crean began with a roster consisting only of two walk-ons who had scored a combined 36 points in their careers. Despite the long odds, Crean was known to approach games and practices as if Indiana could compete in each one and to continue stressing Hoosier Hysteria and the long tradition of success at the school. He was well aware that he was walking into a difficult situation. However, when asked why he left Marquette, Crean replied, "It's Indiana. It's Indiana, and that is the bottom line."

Despite his difficult early years at Indiana, Crean did much to establish goodwill with the fans. For instance, at the first "Midnight Madness" festivities before his first season, Crean brought back "Martha the Mop Lady," the subject of a popular ad that opened Hoosier basketball games on WTTV for 30 years. It featured a cleaning lady whistling "Indiana, Our Indiana" while cleaning Assembly Hall. Since the actress who had appeared in the original ads was unavailable, singer Sheila Stephen stepped in as the new Martha. Starting with the 2010–11 season, video of the original ad was shown at home games after the National Anthem and right before tip off. Later, the video was shown just before the Hoosiers took the court.

The 15 game win improvement in 2011–12 was the largest single turnaround in the NCAA that season. Crean's guidance of the program to success from "unthinkable depths" was widely regarded as one of the most remarkable rebuilding projects in NCAA basketball history. As a result, he was named the mid-season Jim Phelan National Coach of the Year, the Sporting News Big Ten Coach of the Year, and the ESPN.com National Coach of the Year.

For the 2012–13 season, Crean signed five highly touted recruits, self-dubbed "The Movement." Combined with the returning players from the previous season, Indiana dominated the college basketball landscape, spending 10 weeks ranked #1 in the country and all but two weeks in the top 5. The Hoosiers won their first outright Big Ten regular season title in 20 years, and garnered a #1 seed in the NCAA Tournament, also their first in 20 years. The team, led by seniors Christian Watford and Jordan Hulls, along with eventual top-five NBA draft picks Victor Oladipo and Cody Zeller, advanced to the Sweet Sixteen in the NCAA tournament before losing to eventual Final Four participant Syracuse. The next two seasons, 2013–14 and 2014–15, the Hoosiers slipped to records of 17–15 and 20–14 with eighth and seventh-place finishes in the Big Ten, respectively. Despite these low finishes and player arrests, Crean was retained after appearing on many media "hot seat" lists.

After a slow start to the 2015–16 season, Crean and the Hoosiers would eventually go on to be outright Big Ten Regular Season Champions and Crean was named by the coaches and media the Big Ten Coach of the Year. In the 2016 tournament, the team again reached the Sweet Sixteen. During the 2016–17 season, the Hoosiers missed the NCAA Tournament for the 5th time in nine years under Crean despite being ranked #3 in the AP Poll earlier in the season and finished with an 18–16 record, losing in the first round of the NIT to Georgia Tech. Crean was fired by Indiana on March 16, 2017.

== University of Georgia ==
On March 15, 2018, Crean was named head coach of the Georgia Bulldogs. In Crean's four seasons, the Bulldogs went 47-75 overall and 15-57 in SEC play.

They went just 6-26 (1-17 in the SEC) during the 2021-2022 season. On March 10, 2022, Crean was fired by Georgia.

== Coaching style and philosophy ==
Crean's basketball philosophy emphasizes fast breaks and deflections. On offense, he has a reputation for the magnitude of his offensive sets and their multitude of options, with one opposing coach estimating about 400 different sets run. Shot selection is extremely important, with a focus on spacing, inside-out attacks, penetration and kick. Crean utilizes the halfcourt defense which requires great ball pressure, help from teammates, challenging shots, and defensive rebounding.

Crean is considered an excellent recruiter and one of college basketball's best talent evaluators. A hallmark of Crean's programs is the notion that players are joining a family and making sure that players' families are involved in the program. Crean is also known to excel in public relations. At Marquette he began the tradition of Midnight Madness, which was seen as an immediate success. Between 1999 and 2006, Marquette saw a 70% overall increase in attendance, three total attendance records broken, and 1.5 million fans pass through the turnstiles.

On the court Crean is known to walk the sidelines with an intensity normally reserved for football coaches. During his time at Indiana, Crean was criticized by fans and local sports media for the amount of turnovers his teams committed, poor defense, lack of team fundamentals, poor in-state recruiting, large numbers of players transferring, and his "blow-by" handshakes of opposing coaches.

== Head coaching record ==
Record table
Season	Team	Overall	Conference	Standing	Postseason
Marquette Golden Eagles (Conference USA) (1999–2005)
1999–00	Marquette	15–14	8–8	4th (American)	NIT First Round
2000–01	Marquette	15–14	9–7	3rd (American)	
2001–02	Marquette	26–7	13–3	2nd (American)	NCAA Division I Round of 64
2002–03	Marquette	27–6	14–2	1st (American)	NCAA Division I Final Four
2003–04	Marquette	19–12	8–8	8th	NIT Quarterfinal
2004–05	Marquette	19–12	7–9	9th	NIT First Round
Marquette Golden Eagles (Big East Conference) (2005–2008)
2005–06	Marquette	20–11	10–6	T–4th	NCAA Division I Round of 64
2006–07	Marquette	24–10	10–6	T–5th	NCAA Division I Round of 64
2007–08	Marquette	25–10	11–7	T–5th	NCAA Division I Round of 32
Marquette:		190–96 (.664)	90–56 (.616)		
Indiana Hoosiers (Big Ten Conference) (2008–2017)
2008–09	Indiana	6–25	1–17	11th	
2009–10	Indiana	10–21	4–14	T–9th	
2010–11	Indiana	12–20	3–15	11th	
2011–12	Indiana	27–9	11–7	5th	NCAA Division I Sweet 16
2012–13	Indiana	29–7	14–4	1st	NCAA Division I Sweet 16
2013–14	Indiana	17–15	7–11	T–8th	
2014–15	Indiana	20–14	9–9	T–7th	NCAA Division I Round of 64
2015–16	Indiana	27–8	15–3	1st	NCAA Division I Sweet 16
2016–17	Indiana	18–16	7–11	T–10th	NIT First Round
Indiana:		166–135 (.551)	71–91 (.438)		
Georgia Bulldogs (Southeastern Conference) (2018–2022)
2018–19	Georgia	11–21	2–16	13th	
2019–20	Georgia	16–16	5–13	13th	
2020–21	Georgia	14–12	7–11	T–10th	
2021–22	Georgia	6–26	1–17	14th	
Georgia:		47–75 (.385)	15–57 (.208)		
Total:		403–306 (.568)			
National champion Postseason invitational champion Conference regular season champion Conference regular season and conference tournament champion Division regular season champion Division regular season and conference tournament champion Conference tournament champion

== See also ==
- List of NCAA Division I Men's Final Four appearances by coach

== Bibliography ==
- Coaching Team Basketball. Wheaton, IL: McGraw-Hill, 2006. ISBN 978-0-07-146565-6. (with Ralph Pim.)
