= Matthew Judon =

American football player (born 1992)

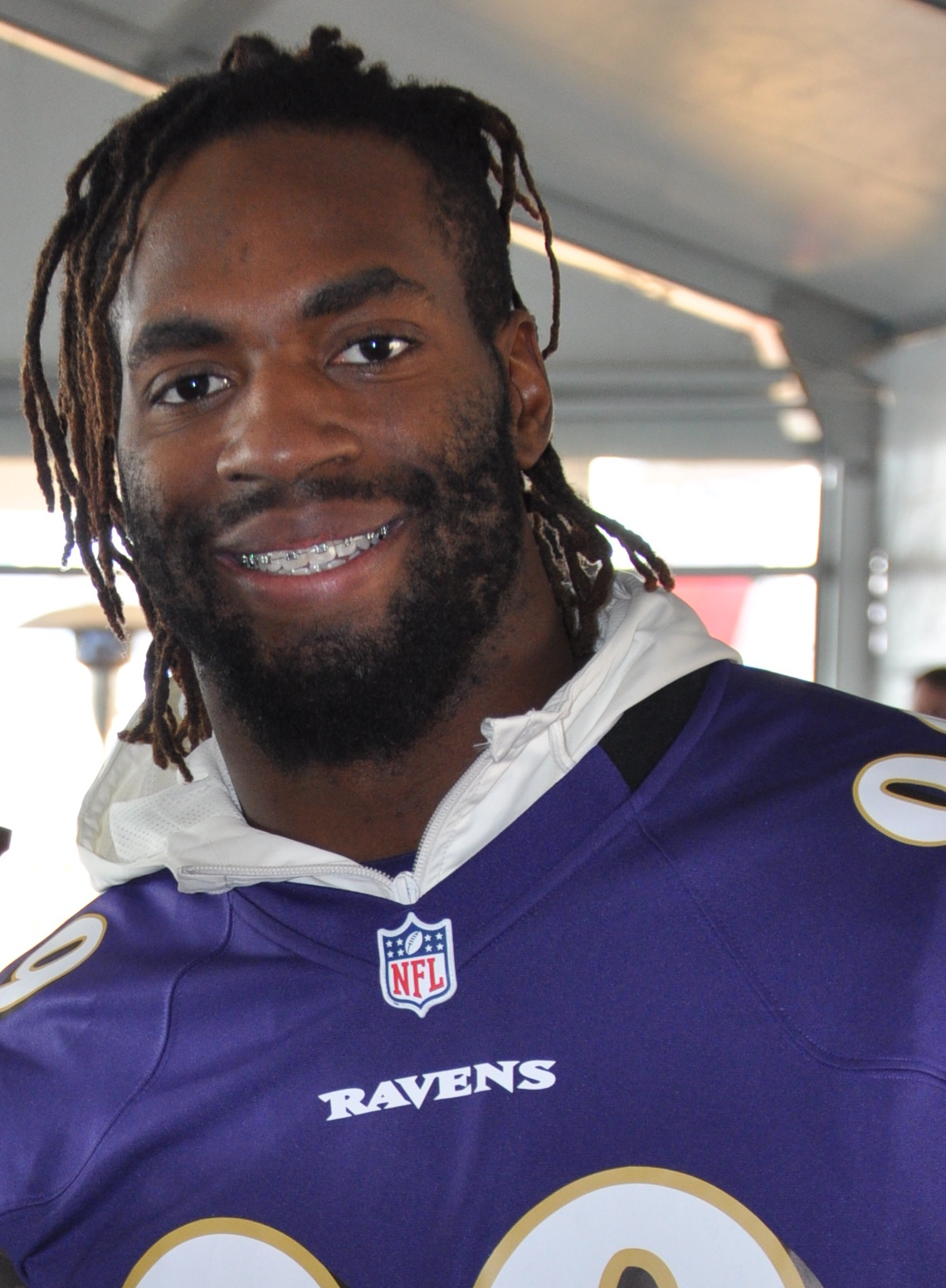
- Judon with the Baltimore Ravens in 2018

Profile
- Positions: Linebacker, defensive end

Personal information
- Born: August 15, 1992 (age 34); Baton Rouge, Louisiana, U.S.
- Listed height: 6 ft 3 in (1.91 m)
- Listed weight: 265 lb (120 kg)

Career information
- High school: West Bloomfield (West Bloomfield, Michigan)
- College: Grand Valley State (2010–2015)
- NFL draft: 2016: 5th round, 146th overall pick

Career history
- Baltimore Ravens (2016–2020); New England Patriots (2021–2023); Atlanta Falcons (2024); Miami Dolphins (2025); Buffalo Bills (2025); San Francisco 49ers (2026)

Awards and highlights
- 4× Pro Bowl (2019–2022); First-team All-American (2015); Gene Upshaw Award (2015); GLIAC Defensive Lineman of the Year (2015)

Career NFL statistics as of 2025
- Total tackles: 429
- Sacks: 72.0
- Forced fumbles: 9
- Fumble recoveries: 4
- Pass deflections: 20
- Interceptions: 1
- Defensive touchdowns: 1
- Stats at Pro Football Reference

Matthew Judon (/ˈdʒudɒn/ JOO-don; born August 15, 1992) is an American professional football linebacker. He played college football for the Grand Valley State Lakers, where he set the Division II record for sacks, and was selected by the Baltimore Ravens in the fifth round of the 2016 NFL draft. He has also played for the New England Patriots, Atlanta Falcons, and Miami Dolphins.

== Professional career ==
=== Pre-draft ===
Judon received an invitation to the East–West Shrine Game, but was unable to play after an arthroscopy discovered what was characterized as a "tweaked meniscus". He was one of sixty-five defensive linemen to receive an invitation to the NFL Combine and the first player from Grand Valley State to receive an invite in two years and opted to attend. Judon showed athleticism and strength, finishing top among defensive linemen in the 40-yard dash (fifth), bench press (fifth), and vertical jump (fourth). On March 15, 2016, he participated at Grand Valley State's pro day, along with four other teammates. Team representatives and scouts from 26 NFL teams attended his pro day as Judon ran positional drills and opted to stand on his combine numbers. He had an impressive workout and raised his draft stock, receiving much praise from scouts who attended. Throughout the pre-draft process, Judon had private workouts and meetings with the Carolina Panthers, New England Patriots, Arizona Cardinals, New Orleans Saints, Tampa Bay Buccaneers, and Philadelphia Eagles. At the conclusion of the pre-draft process, he was projected to be a fourth round pick by NFL draft experts and scouts. Although he showed a great combination of strength and athleticism, his fourth round grade was mainly due to teams being skeptical over his ability to transfer his skills to the professional game since he played Division II football in college and concerns over his history of injuries. He was ranked as the 14th best defensive end prospect by NFLDraftScout.com.

Pre-draft measurables
Height	Weight	Arm length	Hand span	Wingspan	40-yard dash	10-yard split	20-yard split	20-yard shuttle	Three-cone drill	Vertical jump	Broad jump	Bench press
6 ft 3 in (1.91 m)	275 lb (125 kg)	33 7/8 in (0.86 m)	9 1/2 in (0.24 m)	6 ft 8 7/8 in (2.05 m)	4.73 s	1.66 s	2.75 s	4.52 s	7.67 s	35.0 in (0.89 m)	9 ft 1 in (2.77 m)	30 reps
All values from NFL Combine

=== Baltimore Ravens ===
The Baltimore Ravens selected Judon in the fifth round (146th overall) of the 2016 NFL draft. He was the third edge rusher the Ravens drafted in 2016, behind Boise State's Kamalei Correa (second round, 42nd overall) and BYU's Bronson Kaufusi (third round, 70th overall).

==== 2016 ====
On May 5, 2016, the Ravens signed Judon to a four-year, $2.59 million contract with a signing bonus of $255,736.

The Baltimore Ravens opted to make Judon an outside linebacker since their 3–4 scheme would better suit him at that position over defensive end. He competed with Terrell Suggs, Elvis Dumervil, Albert McClellan, Za'Darius Smith, Kamalei Correa, Chris Carter, and Victor Ochi throughout training camp for a job as a starting outside linebacker. Head coach John Harbaugh named him the backup weakside linebacker behind veterans Terrell Suggs and Za'Darius Smith to begin the regular season.

He made his professional regular season debut in the Ravens' season-opener against the Buffalo Bills and assisted on one tackle in their 13–7 victory. Judon was inactive for Weeks 4–5 despite playing well in the first three games as the Ravens decided to play Elvis Dumervil who had recovered from his foot injury. On October 23, 2016, Judon recorded three combined tackles and made two sacks on New York Jets quarterbacks Ryan Fitzpatrick and Geno Smith in their 24–16 loss. His first career sack on Geno Smith in the second quarter caused Smith to tear his ACL and miss the remainder of the season. During a Week 14 matchup at the Patriots, Judon recorded a season-high five combined tackles in their 30–23 loss. He finished the 2016 season with 27 combined tackles (12 solo), four sacks, and two pass deflections in 14 games and zero starts. Judon played minimally due to a lot of depth at the position and the Ravens staff wanting to develop.

==== 2017 ====
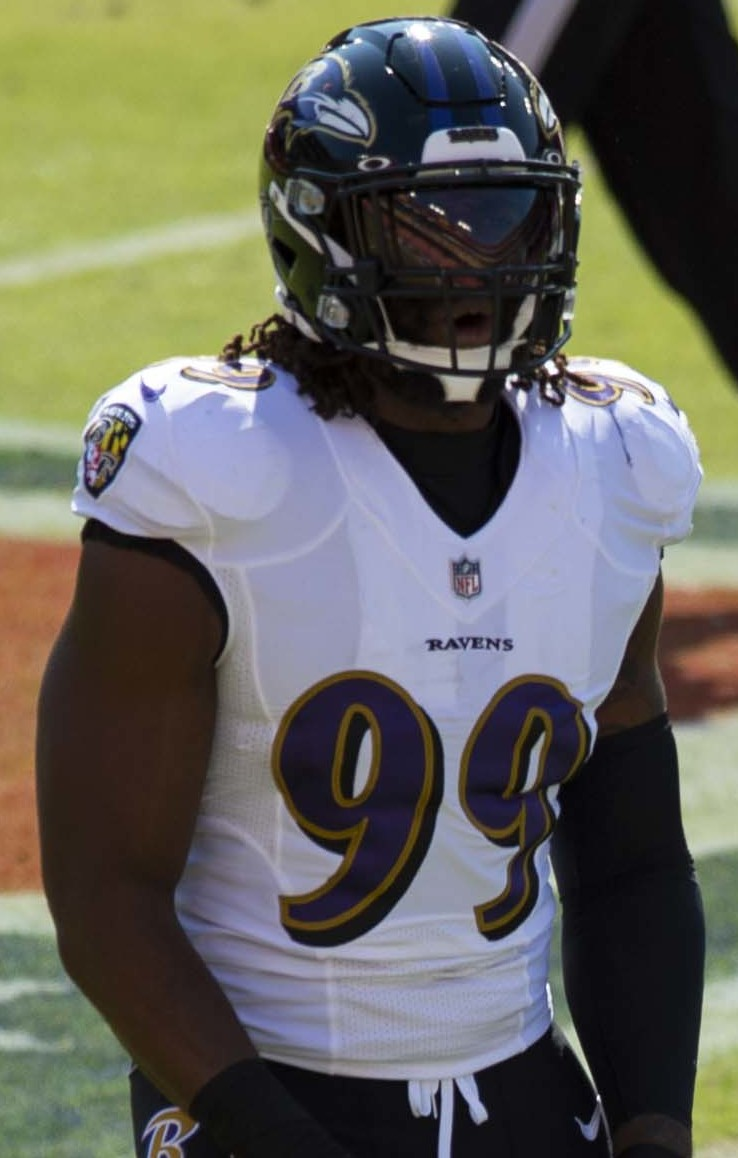
Judon in 2020

He competed with Albert McClellan, Terrell Suggs, Za'Darius Smith, Tyus Bowser, Boseko Lokombo, and Tim Williams throughout training camp for the vacant starting outside linebacker job left by the departure of Elvis Dumervil in free agency. On August 26, 2017, he recorded four solo tackles and sacked Bills quarterback Tyrod Taylor in their 13–9 victory. Judon was named the Baltimore Ravens' starting strongside linebacker, beating out rookie Tyus Bowser, to begin the 2017 season.

Judon made his first career start in the Ravens' season-opener at the Cincinnati Bengals and made one solo tackle and defended a pass in the Ravens' 20–0 victory. During a Week 2 against the Cleveland Browns, Judon recovered a fumble by quarterback DeShone Kizer, that help set up the Ravens' offense on an eventual touchdown scoring drive in the 24–10 victory. On October 15, 2017, Judon recorded a career-high 14 combined tackles (12 solo) and sacked Chicago Bears quarterback Mitchell Trubisky twice in their 27–24 loss. On November 19, 2017, he collected seven combined tackles, two sacks, and forced a fumble during the Ravens' 23–0 win against the Green Bay Packers, earning him AFC Defensive Player of the Week. He finished the season playing in all 16 games with 12 starts, recording 60 combined tackles (50 solo), eight sacks, three passes defensed and two forced fumbles. His eight sacks finished second on the team behind Terrell Suggs' 11 sacks.

==== 2018 ====
In Week 12 against the Raiders, Judon had three sacks in the 34–17 victory. In the 2018 season, Judon played in 16 games with eight starts, finishing tied for second on the team with seven sacks, along with 44 combined tackles, three passes defensed, and a forced fumble.

==== 2019 ====
In week 11 against the Houston Texans, Judon recorded a team high 7 tackles and 2 sacks on Deshaun Watson, one of which was a strip sack on that was recovered by teammate Jaylon Ferguson, in the 41–7 win. In week 14 against the Bills, Judon sacked Josh Allen 1.5 times, including a strip sack which was recovered by Jihad Ward during the 24–17 win which clinched a playoff berth. In week 17 against the Pittsburgh Steelers, Judon recorded a strip sack on Devlin Hodges which was recovered by teammate Michael Pierce during the 28–10 win. In the 2019 season, Judon started in all 16 games. He finished with 9.5 sacks, 54 total tackles (43 solo), and four forced fumbles.

==== 2020 ====
The Ravens placed the franchise tag on Judon on March 13, 2020. On May 28, 2020, Judon signed the one-year, $16.808 million franchise tender. In Week 4 against the Washington Football Team, Judon recorded his first two sacks of the season on Dwayne Haskins during the 31–17 win. In Week 8 against the Steelers, Judon was ejected from the game after making contact with an official. He was placed on the reserve/COVID-19 list by the team on November 3, 2020, and activated two days later. He was placed back on the COVID-19 list on November 30, and activated again on December 9. In Week 15 against the Jacksonville Jaguars, Judon recorded a sack on Gardner Minshew in the endzone for a safety during the 40–14 win. In the 2020 season, he appeared in 14 games and started 13. He finished with six sacks, one safety, 50 total tackles (32 solo), and two passes defended.

=== New England Patriots ===
==== 2021 ====
On March 19, 2021, Judon signed a four-year, $56 million contract with the New England Patriots. Judon surpassed his career high in sacks by Week 11, earning him Pro Bowl honors for a third consecutive season. He finished the 2021 season with 12.5 sacks, 60 total tackles (38 solo), one pass defended, and one fumble recovery. He was ranked 52nd by his fellow players on the NFL Top 100 Players of 2022.

==== 2022 ====
In Week 5 of the 2022 season, Judon had two sacks in a 29–0 win over the Detroit Lions, earning AFC Defensive Player of the Week. In Week 7, he had 2.5 sacks against the Bears. In Week 9, he had three sacks against the Colts. Judon surpassed his career high in sacks by Week 11 against the New York Jets, recording 1.5 sacks and reaching 13 on the year. He finished the season with 15.5 sacks, which was fourth in the NFL, along with 60 tackles, two forced fumbles, and three passes defensed.

==== 2023 ====
Prior to the start of the 2023 season, Judon was ranked 33rd by fellow players for the NFL Top 100 Players of 2023. On August 4, 2023, Judon and the Patriots agreed to a contract adjustment. He recorded a safety in Week 3 against the Jets. He suffered a torn lower bicep in Week 4 and was placed on injured reserve on October 14, 2023.

=== Atlanta Falcons ===
On August 14, 2024, Judon was traded to the Atlanta Falcons for a 2025 third-round pick. In Week 16 against the New York Giants, he had a 27-yard pick-six. He finished the 2024 season with 5.5 sacks, 41 tackles, one interception return for a touchdown, and five passes defended.

=== Miami Dolphins ===
On August 19, 2025, Judon signed a one-year, $6 million contract with the Miami Dolphins. He made 13 appearances (three starts) for Miami, recording one pass deflection and 19 combined tackles. Judon was waived by the Dolphins on December 17.

=== Buffalo Bills ===
On December 20, 2025, Judon was signed to the Buffalo Bills' practice squad. He was elevated from the practice squad on January 3, and played in the Bills' 35–8 win over the New York Jets the next day.

=== San Francisco 49ers ===
On September 28, 2026, Judon was signed to the San Francisco 49ers' practice squad, and elevated to the active roster on October 3. He was released on October 10.

== NFL career statistics ==
Legend
	Led the league
**Bold**	Career high

=== Regular season ===
Year	Team	Games		Tackles					Fumbles			Interceptions						Stuffs		
Year	Team	GP	GS	Cmb	Solo	Ast	Sck	TFL	FF	FR	Yds	Int	Yds	Avg	Lng	TD	PD	Stf	Yds	Sfty
2016	BAL	14	0	27	12	15	4.0	4	0	**1**	**3**	0	0	0.0	0	0	2	0	0	0
2017	BAL	16	12	**61**	**51**	10	8.0	**17**	2	**1**	0	0	0	0.0	0	0	3	**10**	29	0
2018	BAL	16	8	44	29	15	7.0	10	1	0	0	0	0	0.0	0	0	3	5	23	0
2019	BAL	16	16	54	43	11	9.5	14	**4**	0	0	0	0	0.0	0	0	0	9	**30**	0
2020	BAL	14	13	50	32	18	6.0	9	0	0	0	0	0	0.0	0	0	2	3	9	**1**
2021	NE	17	16	60	38	22	12.5	14	0	**1**	−6	0	0	0.0	0	0	1	7.5	4	0
2022	NE	17	15	60	36	**24**	**15.5**	14	2	**1**	1	0	0	0.0	0	0	3	7	4	0
2023	NE	4	2	13	10	3	4.0	5	0	0	0	0	0	0.0	0	0	0	1	0	**1**
2024	ATL	17	15	41	25	16	5.5	7	0	0	0	**1**	**27**	**27.0**	**27**	**1**	**5**	6	3	0
2025	MIA	13	3	19	9	10	0.0	1	0	0	0	0	0	0.0	0	0	1	1.5	1	0
2025	BUF	1	0	0	0	0	0.0	0	0	0	0	0	0	0.0	0	0	0	0.0	0	0
Career		145	100	429	285	144	72.0	95	9	4	−2	1	27	27.0	27	1	20	50	103	2

=== Postseason ===
Year	Team	Games		Tackles					Fumbles			Interceptions						Stuffs		
Year	Team	GP	GS	Cmb	Solo	Ast	Sck	TFL	FF	FR	Yds	Int	Yds	Avg	Lng	TD	PD	Stf	Yds	Sfty
2018	BAL	1	0	4	3	1	0.0	**2**	0	0	0.0	0	0	0	0	0	0	0	0	0
2019	BAL	1	1	3	1	**2**	0.0	0	0	0	0.0	0	0	0	0	0	0	0	0	0
2020	BAL	2	2	**6**	**5**	1	**1.0**	1	**1**	0	0.0	0	0	0	0	0	0	0	0	0
2021	NE	1	0	1	1	0	0.0	0	0	0	0.0	0	0	0	0	0	0	0	0	0
Career		5	3	14	10	4	1.0	3	1	0	0.0	0	0	0	0	0	0	0	0	0

== Personal life ==
Judon was born in the United States and is of Burundian descent. He is one of ten children. At Grand Valley State, he wore the number 9 to honor his nine siblings. When the NFL changed uniform rules to allow defensive linemen to wear single-digit numbers in 2021, he chose it for his uniform number with the Patriots.
