= 2017 Baltimore Ravens season =

22nd season in franchise history

- Owner: Steve Bisciotti
- General manager: Ozzie Newsome
- Head coach: John Harbaugh
- Offensive coordinator: Marty Mornhinweg
- Defensive coordinator: Dean Pees
- Home stadium: M&T Bank Stadium

Results
- Record: 9–7
- Division place: 2nd AFC North
- Playoffs: Did not qualify
- All-Pros: 2: K Justin Tucker (2nd team); LB C. J. Mosley (2nd team)
- Pro Bowlers: 3: ILB C. J. Mosley; OLB Terrell Suggs; FS Eric Weddle

Uniform
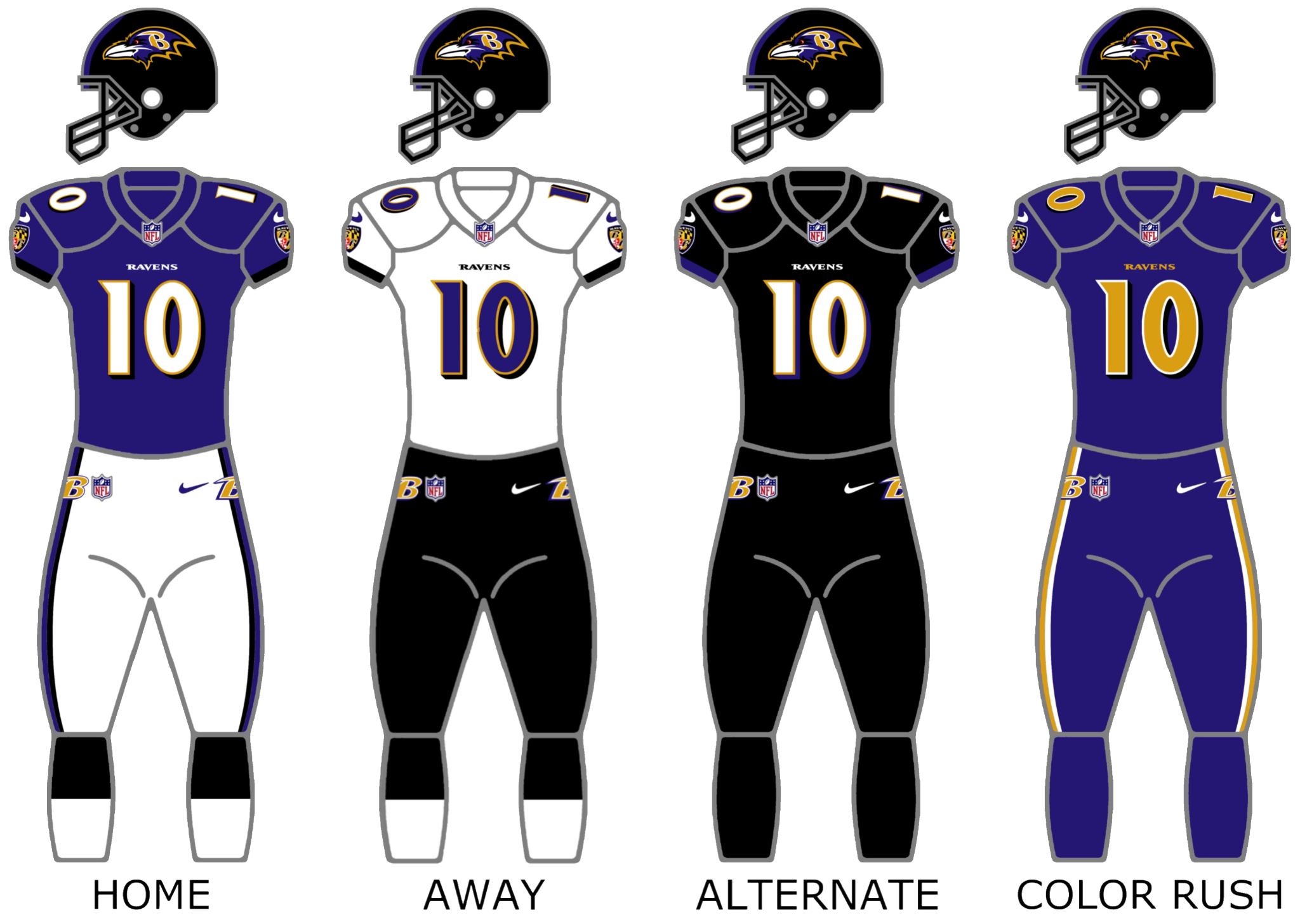

The 2017 season was the Baltimore Ravens' 22nd in the National Football League (NFL) and their 10th under head coach John Harbaugh. This was also the 10th season with Joe Flacco as the team's starting quarterback. The Ravens improved on the previous season's 8–8 record, but failed to qualify for the playoffs for the third consecutive season because of a last second touchdown in a 31–27 loss to the Cincinnati Bengals, combined with a Buffalo Bills' victory over the Miami Dolphins in Week 17.

== Offseason ==
=== Signings ===
Position	Player	Age	2016 Team	Contract
DT	Brandon Williams	28	Baltimore Ravens	5 years, $52.2 million
SS	Tony Jefferson	25	Arizona Cardinals	4 years, $34 million
CB	Brandon Carr	30	Dallas Cowboys	4 years, $23.5 million
RB	Danny Woodhead	32	San Diego Chargers	3 years, $8.8 million
FS	Lardarius Webb	31	Baltimore Ravens	3 years, $6.3 million
FS	Anthony Levine	30	Baltimore Ravens	3 years, $4.2 million
WR	Jeremy Maclin	29	Kansas City Chiefs	2 years, $11 million

=== Releases ===
Position	Player	Age	2017 Team
LB	Elvis Dumervil	33	San Francisco 49ers
CB	Shareece Wright	30	Buffalo Bills
FS	Kendrick Lewis	30	
SS	Matt Elam	25	
CB	Chris Lewis-Harris	28	Denver Broncos
CB	Jumal Rolle	26	Arizona Cardinals
CB	Jerraud Powers	29	Retired
G	John Urschel	26	Retired

== Draft ==
2017 Baltimore Ravens draft
Round	Pick	Player	Position	College	Notes
1	16	Marlon Humphrey *	CB	Alabama	
2	47	Tyus Bowser	OLB	Houston	
3	74	Chris Wormley	DT	Michigan	
3	78	Tim Williams	DE	Alabama	
4	122	Nico Siragusa	G	San Diego State	
5	159	Jermaine Eluemunor	OT	Texas A&M	
6	186	Chuck Clark	S	Virginia Tech	
Made roster † Pro Football Hall of Fame * Made at least one Pro Bowl during career

Notes

- The Ravens traded their third-round selection (No. 99) and defensive tackle Timmy Jernigan to the Philadelphia Eagles in exchange for the Eagles' third-round selection (No. 74).
- The Ravens traded their sixth-round selection (No. 198) and center Jeremy Zuttah to the San Francisco 49ers in exchange for the 49ers' sixth-round selection (No. 186).
- The Ravens traded their seventh-round selection (No. 234) to the Los Angeles Rams during the 2015 season in exchange for wide receiver Chris Givens.

== Staff ==
2017 Baltimore Ravens staff
Front office: Owner – Steve Bisciotti; President – Dick Cass; Executive vice president/general manager – Ozzie Newsome; Assistant general manager – Eric DeCosta; Senior vice president of football administration – Pat Moriarty; Director of pro personnel – Vince Newsome; Director of college scouting – Joe Hortiz; Director of football administration – Jessica Markison; Senior personnel assistant – George Kokinis; Assistant director of pro personnel – Chad Alexander; Head coaches: Head coach – John Harbaugh; Assistant to the head coach – Dan Parsons; Offensive coaches: Offensive coordinator/quarterbacks – Marty Mornhinweg; Running backs – Thomas Hammock; Wide receivers – Bobby Engram; Senior offensive assistant/tight ends – Greg Roman; Offensive line – Joe D'Alessandris; Assistant offensive line – Richard Angulo; Offensive assistant – Andy Bischoff; Offensive assistant – Craig Ver Steeg; Offensive assistant – Matt Weiss	Defensive coaches: Defensive coordinator – Dean Pees; Defensive line – Joe Cullen; Assistant defensive line – Drew Wilkins; Linebackers – Don Martindale; Secondary – Chris Hewitt; Defensive backs – Mike Macdonald; Special teams coaches: Associate head coach/special teams coordinator – Jerry Rosburg; Assistant special teams – Chris Horton; Specialist – Randy Brown; Strength and conditioning: Strength and conditioning – Juney Barnett; Performance coach – Steve Saunders

== Final roster ==
2017 Baltimore Ravens roster
Quarterbacks (QB): 5 Joe Flacco; 15 Ryan Mallett; Running backs (RB): 37 Javorius Allen; 34 Alex Collins; 42 Patrick Ricard FB; 28 Terrance West; 39 Danny Woodhead; Wide receivers (WR): 16 Quincy Adeboyejo; 12 Michael Campanaro; 18 Jeremy Maclin; 10 Chris Moore; 11 Breshad Perriman; 17 Mike Wallace; Tight ends (TE): 86 Nick Boyle; 88 Vince Mayle; 82 Ben Watson; 87 Maxx Williams	Offensive linemen (OL): 61 Luke Bowanko C; 70 Andrew Donnal T; 71 Jermaine Eluemunor G; 77 Austin Howard T; 74 James Hurst G; 66 Ryan Jensen C; 76 Maurquice Shakir G; 68 Matt Skura G; 79 Ronnie Stanley T; Defensive linemen (DL): 94 Carl Davis DE; 69 Willie Henry DE; 97 Michael Pierce NT; 98 Brandon Williams DE; 93 Chris Wormley DE	Linebackers (LB): 54 Tyus Bowser OLB; 51 Kamalei Correa ILB; 58 Steven Johnson ILB; 99 Matthew Judon OLB; 92 Bronson Kaufusi OLB; 57 C. J. Mosley ILB; 48 Patrick Onwuasor ILB; 90 Za'Darius Smith OLB; 55 Terrell Suggs OLB; 56 Tim Williams OLB; Defensive backs (DB): 26 Maurice Canady CB; 24 Brandon Carr CB; 36 Chuck Clark FS; 29 Marlon Humphrey CB; 38 Stanley Jean-Baptiste CB; 23 Tony Jefferson SS; 41 Anthony Levine SS; 21 Lardarius Webb FS; 32 Eric Weddle FS; Special teams (ST): 46 Morgan Cox LS; 4 Sam Koch P; 9 Justin Tucker K	Practice squad: 85 Kenny Bell WR; 45 John Crockett RB; 31 Robertson Daniel CB; 78 Dieugot Joseph T; 95 Kapron Lewis-Moore DE; 62 Steven Moore T; 33 Robert Nelson CB; 44 Ricky Ortiz FB; 59 Darnell Sankey ILB; 7 Josh Woodrum QB; Reserve: 35 Brandon Boykin CB (IR); 53 Bam Bradley ILB (IR); 30 Kenneth Dixon RB (IR); 80 Crockett Gillmore TE (IR); 43 Jaylen Hill CB (IR); 60 Brandon Kublanow C (IR); 72 Alex Lewis G (IR); 50 Albert McClellan OLB (IR); 67 Stephane Nembot T (IR); 65 Nico Siragusa G (IR); 22 Jimmy Smith CB (IR); 96 Brent Urban DE (IR); 84 Darren Waller TE (Susp.); 6 Tim White WR (IR); 73 Marshal Yanda G (IR); 25 Tavon Young CB (IR); Rookies in italics 53 active, 16 reserve, 10 practice squad

=== Accolades ===
- Tyus Bowser – Pepsi Rookie of the Week, Week 2
- Matthew Judon – AFC Defensive Player of the Week, week 11
- Sam Koch – AFC Special Teams Player of the Week, week 12
- Justin Tucker – AFC Special Teams Player of the Month, November
- Eric Weddle – AFC Defensive Player of the Week, week 13
- Sam Koch – AFC Special Teams Player of the Week, week 15

=== Pro Bowlers ===
- C. J. Mosley
- Terrell Suggs
- Eric Weddle

=== All-Pros ===
- Justin Tucker – Second team
- C. J. Mosley – Second team

== Preseason ==
Week	Date	Opponent	Result	Record	Venue	Recap
1	August 10	Washington Redskins	W 23–3	1–0	M&T Bank Stadium	Recap
2	August 17	at Miami Dolphins	W 31–7	2–0	Hard Rock Stadium	Recap
3	August 26	Buffalo Bills	W 13–9	3–0	M&T Bank Stadium	Recap
4	August 31	at New Orleans Saints	W 14–13	4–0	Mercedes-Benz Superdome	Recap

== Regular season ==
=== Schedule ===
Week	Date	Opponent	Result	Record	Venue	Recap
1	September 10	at **Cincinnati Bengals**	**W** 20–0	1–0	Paul Brown Stadium	Recap
2	September 17	**Cleveland Browns**	**W** 24–10	2–0	M&T Bank Stadium	Recap
3	September 24	at Jacksonville Jaguars	**L** 7–44	2–1	(United Kingdom) Wembley Stadium (London)	Recap
4	October 1	**Pittsburgh Steelers**	**L** 9–26	2–2	M&T Bank Stadium	Recap
5	October 8	at Oakland Raiders	**W** 30–17	3–2	Oakland–Alameda County Coliseum	Recap
6	October 15	Chicago Bears	**L** 24–27 (OT)	3–3	M&T Bank Stadium	Recap
7	October 22	at Minnesota Vikings	**L** 16–24	3–4	U.S. Bank Stadium	Recap
8	October 26	Miami Dolphins	**W** 40–0	4–4	M&T Bank Stadium	Recap
9	November 5	at Tennessee Titans	**L** 20–23	4–5	Nissan Stadium	Recap
10	Bye					
11	November 19	at Green Bay Packers	**W** 23–0	5–5	Lambeau Field	Recap
12	November 27	Houston Texans	**W** 23–16	6–5	M&T Bank Stadium	Recap
13	December 3	Detroit Lions	**W** 44–20	7–5	M&T Bank Stadium	Recap
14	December 10	at **Pittsburgh Steelers**	**L** 38–39	7–6	Heinz Field	Recap
15	December 17	at **Cleveland Browns**	**W** 27–10	8–6	FirstEnergy Stadium	Recap
16	December 23	Indianapolis Colts	**W** 23–16	9–6	M&T Bank Stadium	Recap
17	December 31	**Cincinnati Bengals**	**L** 27–31	9–7	M&T Bank Stadium	Recap

Note: Intra-division opponents are in bold text.

=== Game summaries ===
==== Week 1: Baltimore Ravens 20, Cincinnati Bengals 0 ====
Week One: Baltimore Ravens at Cincinnati Bengals – Game summary

Quarter	1	2	3	4	Total
**Ravens**	3	14	3	0	**20**
Bengals	0	0	0	0	**0**

at Paul Brown Stadium, Cincinnati, Ohio

- Date: September 10
- Game time: 1:02 p.m. EDT
- Game weather: 68 °F (20 °C), sunny
- Game attendance: 55,254
- Referee: Walt Coleman
- TV announcers (CBS): Spero Dedes, Adam Archuleta, and Melanie Collins
- Recap, Gamebook

Game information

**First quarter**

- BAL – Justin Tucker 25-yard field goal, 4:47. Ravens 3–0. **Drive: 13 plays, 57 yards, 7:54.**

**Second quarter**

- BAL – Jeremy Maclin 48-yard pass from Joe Flacco, (Justin Tucker kick), 1:52. Drive: Ravens 10–0. **7 plays, 76 yards, 3:54.**
- BAL – Terrance West 2-yard run, (Justin Tucker kick), 1:28. Ravens 17–0. **Drive: 1 play, 2 yards, 0:03.**

**Third quarter**

- BAL – Justin Tucker 25-yard field goal, 1:09. Ravens 20–0. **Drive: 18 plays, 81 yards, 9:38.**

**Fourth quarter**

- No scoring plays.

**Top passers**

- BAL – Joe Flacco – 9/17, 121 yards, TD, INT
- CIN – Andy Dalton – 16/31, 170 yards, 4 INT

**Top rushers**

- BAL – Terrance West – 19 rushes, 80 yards, TD
- CIN – Giovani Bernard – 7 rushes, 40 yards

**Top receivers**

- BAL – Jeremy Maclin – 2 receptions, 56 yards, TD
- CIN – A. J. Green – 5 receptions, 74 yards

==== Week 2: Baltimore Ravens 24, Cleveland Browns 10 ====
Week Two: Cleveland Browns at Baltimore Ravens – Game summary

Quarter	1	2	3	4	Total
Browns	0	7	3	0	**10**
**Ravens**	7	14	0	3	**24**

at M&T Bank Stadium, Baltimore, Maryland

- Date: September 17
- Game time: 1:02 pm. EDT
- Game weather: 80 °F (27 °C), mostly cloudy
- Game attendance: 70,605
- Referee: Gene Steratore
- TV announcers (CBS): Andrew Catalon, James Lofton, and Steve Tasker
- Recap, Gamebook

Game information

**First quarter**

- BAL – Terrance West 4-yard run, (Justin Tucker kick), 3:56. Ravens 7–0. **Drive: 7 plays, 33 yards, 3:34.**

**Second quarter**

- BAL – Javorius Allen 9-yard pass from Joe Flacco, (Justin Tucker kick), 7:17. Ravens 14–0. **Drive: 6 plays, 64 yards, 3:26.**
- CLE – David Njoku 23-yard pass from Kevin Hogan, (Zane Gonzalez kick), 4:56. Ravens 14–7. **Drive: 5 plays, 83 yards, 2:21.**
- BAL – Jeremy Maclin 2-yard pass from Joe Flacco, (Justin Tucker kick), 0:01. Ravens 21–7. **Drive: 3 plays, 40 yards, 0:18.**

**Third quarter**

- CLE – Zane Gonzalez 38-yard field goal, 9:24. Ravens 21–10. **Drive: 8 plays, 62 yards, 2:48.**

**Fourth quarter**

- BAL – Justin Tucker 28-yard field goal, 15:00. Ravens 24–10. **Drive: 11 plays, 53 yards, 6:19.**

**Top passers**

- CLE – DeShone Kizer – 15/31, 182 yards, 3 INT
- BAL – Joe Flacco – 25/34, 217 yards, 2 TD, INT

**Top rushers**

- CLE – Isaiah Crowell – 10 rushes, 37 yards
- BAL – Javorius Allen – 14 rushes, 66 yards

**Top receivers**

- CLE – Rashard Higgins – 7 receptions, 95 yards
- BAL – Benjamin Watson – 8 receptions, 91 yards

==== Week 3: Jacksonville Jaguars 44, Baltimore Ravens 7 ====
NFL London Games

Week Three: Baltimore Ravens at Jacksonville Jaguars – Game summary

Quarter	1	2	3	4	Total
Ravens	0	0	0	7	**7**
**Jaguars**	10	13	14	7	**44**

at Wembley Stadium, London, England

- Date: September 24
- Game time: 2:35 p.m. BST/9:35 am. EDT
- Game weather: 70 °F (21 °C), sunny
- Game attendance: 84,592
- Referee: Pete Morelli
- TV announcers (Yahoo! Sports): Andrew Catalon, James Lofton, and Alex Flanagan
- Recap, Gamebook

Game information

**First quarter**

- JAX – Jason Myers 23-yard field goal, 9:05. Jaguars 3–0. **Drive: 9 plays, 58 yards, 4:27.**
- JAX – Marcedes Lewis 17-yard pass from Blake Bortles (Jason Myers kick), 3:32. Jaguars 10–0. **Drive: 7 plays, 80 yards, 3:53.**

**Second quarter**

- JAX – Jason Myers 45-yard field goal, 10:49. Jaguars 13–0. **Drive: 10 plays, 34 yards, 6:16.**
- JAX – Allen Hurns 5-yard pass from Blake Bortles (Jason Myers kick), 4:55. Jaguars 20–0. **Drive: 8 plays, 28 yards, 3:11.**
- JAX – Jason Myers 29-yard field goal, 0:38. Jaguars 23–0. **Drive: 9 plays, 66 yards, 2:15.**

**Third quarter**

- JAX – Marcedes Lewis 30-yard pass from Blake Bortles (Jason Myers kick), 9:42. Jaguars 30–0. **Drive: 2 plays, 32 yards, 0:43.**
- JAX – Marcedes Lewis 4-yard pass from Blake Bortles (Jason Myers kick), 7:48. Jaguars 37–0. **Drive: 2 plays, 2 yards, 0:25.**

**Fourth quarter**

- JAX – Leonard Fournette 3-yard run (Jason Myers kick), 14:56. Jaguars 44–0. **Drive: 7 plays, 85 yards, 3:28.**
- BAL – Benjamin Watson 6-yard pass from Ryan Mallett (Justin Tucker kick), 3:24. Jaguars 44–7. **Drive: 9 plays, 76 yards, 5:09.**

**Top passers**

- BAL – Ryan Mallett – 6/9, 36 yards, TD
- JAX – Blake Bortles – 20/31, 244 yards, 4 TD

**Top rushers**

- BAL – Alex Collins – 9 rushes, 82 yards
- JAX – Corey Grant – 6 rushes, 75 yards

**Top receivers**

- BAL – Nick Boyle – 2 receptions, 14 yards
- JAX – Marqise Lee – 4 receptions, 65 yards

==== Week 4: Pittsburgh Steelers 26, Baltimore Ravens 9 ====
Week Four: Pittsburgh Steelers at Baltimore Ravens – Game summary

Quarter	1	2	3	4	Total
**Steelers**	3	16	0	7	**26**
Ravens	0	0	9	0	**9**

at M&T Bank Stadium, Baltimore, Maryland

- Date: October 1
- Game time: 1:02 pm. EDT
- Game weather: 64 °F (18 °C), sunny
- Game attendance: 71,126
- Referee: Walt Anderson
- TV announcers (CBS): Ian Eagle, Dan Fouts, and Evan Washburn
- Recap, Gamebook

Game information

**First quarter**

- PIT – Chris Boswell 30-yard field goal, 0:26. Steelers 3–0. **Drive: 16 plays, 84 yards, 10:23.**

**Second quarter**

- PIT – Chris Boswell 49-yard field goal, 7:28. Steelers 6–0. **Drive: 9 plays, 15 yards, 2:59.**
- PIT – Le'Veon Bell 1-yard run (Chris Boswell kick), 3:24. Steelers 13–0. **Drive: 6 plays, 28 yards, 2:24.**
- PIT – JuJu Smith-Schuster 11-yard pass from Ben Roethlisberger (pass failed), 0:45. Steelers 19–0. **Drive: 8 plays, 70 yards, 1:35.**

**Third quarter**

- BAL – Justin Tucker 42-yard field goal, 12:36. Steelers 19–3. **Drive: 4 plays, −6 yards, 0:56.**
- BAL – Mike Wallace 16-yard pass from Joe Flacco (Terrance West run failed). Steelers 19–9. **Drive: 3 plays, 66 yards, 1:03.**

**Fourth quarter**

- PIT – Le'Veon Bell 1-yard run (Chris Boswell kick), 2:26. Steelers 26–9. **Drive: 7 plays, 49 yards, 3:11.**

**Top passers**

- PIT – Ben Roethlisberger – 18/30, 216 yards, TD, INT
- BAL – Joe Flacco – 31/49, 235 yards, TD, 2 INT

**Top rushers**

- PIT – Le'Veon Bell – 35 rushes, 144 yards, 2 TD
- BAL – Alex Collins – 9 rushes, 82 yards

**Top receivers**

- PIT – Martavis Bryant – 3 receptions, 48 yards
- BAL – Mike Wallace – 6 receptions, 55 yards, TD

==== Week 5: Baltimore Ravens 30, Oakland Raiders 17 ====
Week Five: Baltimore Ravens at Oakland Raiders – Game summary

Quarter	1	2	3	4	Total
**Ravens**	14	10	0	6	**30**
Raiders	3	7	7	0	**17**

at Oakland–Alameda County Coliseum, Oakland, California

- Date: October 8
- Game time: 4:05 pm. EDT/1:05 p.m. PDT
- Game weather: 72 °F (22 °C), sunny
- Game attendance: 54,980
- Referee: Brad Allen
- TV announcers (CBS): Greg Gumbel, Trent Green, and Jamie Erdahl
- Recap, Gamebook

Game information

**First quarter**

- BAL – Vince Mayle 2-yard run (Justin Tucker kick), 12:45. Ravens 7–0. **Drive: 5 plays, 75 yards, 2:15.**
- BAL – Jimmy Smith 47-yard fumble return (Justin Tucker kick), 11:10. Ravens 14–0.
- OAK – Giorgio Tavecchio 32-yard field goal, 5:07. Ravens 14–3. **Drive: 12 plays, 61 yards, 6:03.**

**Second quarter**

- BAL – Javorius Allen 1-yard run (Justin Tucker kick), 11:57. Ravens 21–3. **Drive: 15 plays, 75 yards, 8:10.**
- OAK – Michael Crabtree 41-yard pass from EJ Manuel (Giorgio Tavecchio kick), 9:11. Ravens 21–10. **Drive: 6 plays, 75 yards, 2:46.**
- BAL – Justin Tucker 22-yard field goal, 5:18. Ravens 24–10. **Drive: 8 plays, 70 yards, 3:53.**

**Third quarter**

- OAK – Marshawn Lynch 3-yard run (Giorgio Tavecchio kick), 3:46. Ravens 24–17. **Drive: 12 plays, 65 yards, 4:42.**

**Fourth quarter**

- BAL – Justin Tucker 21-yard field goal, 13:10. Ravens 27–10. **Drive: 12 plays, 72 yards, 5:36.**
- BAL – Justin Tucker 44-yard field goal, 2:24. Ravens 30–10. **Drive: 13 plays, 54 yards, 6:26.**

**Top passers**

- BAL – Joe Flacco – 19/26, 222 yards
- OAK – EJ Manuel – 13/26, 159 yards, TD

**Top rushers**

- BAL – Javorius Allen – 21 attempts, 73 yards, TD
- OAK – Marshawn Lynch – 12 attempts, 43 yards, TD

**Top receivers**

- BAL – Mike Wallace – 3 receptions, 133 yards
- OAK – Michael Crabtree – 6 receptions, 82 yards, TD

After several weeks of dismal offensive plays, the Ravens traveled west to Oakland having lost two straight to the Raiders. But the offense was able to power through behind a very strong defensive performance, albeit with Raiders' starting quarterback Derek Carr injured.

==== Week 6: Chicago Bears 27, Baltimore Ravens 24 (OT) ====
Week Six: Chicago Bears at Baltimore Ravens – Game summary

Quarter	1	2	3	4	OT	Total
**Bears**	0	10	7	7	3	**27**
Ravens	0	3	7	14	0	**24**

at M&T Bank Stadium, Baltimore, Maryland

- Date: October 15
- Game time: 1:02 pm. EDT
- Game weather: 69 °F (21 °C), partly cloudy
- Game attendance: 70,616
- Referee: Ed Hochuli
- TV announcers (Fox): Sam Rosen, Ronde Barber, and Kristina Pink
- Recap, Gamebook

Game information

**First quarter**

- No scoring plays.

**Second quarter**

- CHI – Connor Barth 24-yard field goal, 10:54. Bears 3–0. **Drive: 10 plays, 60 yards, 4:19.**
- CHI – Zach Miller 21-yard pass from Tarik Cohen (Connor Barth kick good), 2:53. Bears 10–0. **Drive: 2 plays, 20 yards, 0:43.**
- BAL – Justin Tucker 27-yard field goal, 0:03. Bears 10–3. **Drive: 12 plays, 55 yards, 1:37.**

**Third quarter**

- CHI – Dion Sims 27-yard pass from Mitchell Trubisky (Connor Barth kick good), 6:01. Bears 17–3. **Drive: 7 plays, 66 yards, 3:41.**
- BAL – Bobby Rainey 96-yard kickoff return (Justin Tucker kick good), 5:47. Bears 17–10.

**Fourth quarter**

- BAL – Justin Tucker 31-yard field goal, 11:26. Bears 17–13. **Drive: 10 plays, 26 yards, 3:58.**
- CHI – Adrian Amos 91-yard interception return (Connor Barth kick good), 5:08. Bears 24–13
- BAL – Justin Tucker 50-yard field goal, 2:56. Bears 24–16. **Drive: 10 plays, 44 yards, 2:12.**
- BAL – Michael Campanaro 77-yard punt return (Nick Boyle pass from Joe Flacco good), 1:55. Tied 24–24

**Overtime**

- CHI – Connor Barth 40-yard field goal, 2:06. Bears 27–24. **Drive: 8 plays, 71 yards, 5:40.**

**Top passers**

- CHI – Mitchell Trubisky – 8/16, 113 yards, TD
- BAL – Joe Flacco – 24/41, 180 yards, 2 INT

**Top rushers**

- CHI – Jordan Howard – 36 rushes, 167 yards
- BAL – Alex Collins – 15 rushes, 74 yards

**Top receivers**

- CHI – Dion Sims – 4 receptions, 42 yards, TD
- BAL – Chris Moore – 8 receptions, 28 yards

The Ravens were upset by the Bears at home. The loss moved the Ravens to 3-3.

==== Week 7: Minnesota Vikings 24, Baltimore Ravens 16 ====
Week Seven: Baltimore Ravens at Minnesota Vikings – Game summary

Quarter	1	2	3	4	Total
Ravens	3	3	3	7	**16**
**Vikings**	3	6	9	6	**24**

at U.S. Bank Stadium, Minneapolis, Minnesota

- Date: October 22
- Game time: 1:02 pm. EDT/12:02 p.m. CDT
- Game weather: Played indoors (domed stadium)
- Game attendance: 66,751
- Referee: Carl Cheffers
- TV announcers (CBS): Greg Gumbel, Trent Green, and Jamie Erdahl
- Recap, Gamebook

Game information

**First quarter**

- BAL – Justin Tucker 48-yard field goal, 8:30. Ravens 3–0. **Drive: 9 plays, 35 yards, 4:11.**
- MIN – Kai Forbath 52-yard field goal, 3:39. Tied 3–3. **Drive: 12 plays, 41 yards, 4:51.**

**Second quarter**

- MIN – Kai Forbath 51-yard field goal, 12:55. Vikings 6–3. **Drive: 8 plays, 38 yards, 2:50.**
- BAL – Justin Tucker 57-yard field goal, 9:56. Tied 6–6. **Drive: 6 plays, 33 yards, 2:59.**
- MIN – Kai Forbath 43-yard field goal, 0:35. Vikings 9–6. **Drive: 15 plays, 60 yards, 7:01.**

**Third quarter**

- MIN – Kai Forbath 43-yard field goal, 10:53. Vikings 12–6. **Drive: 7 plays, 50 yards, 4:07.**
- MIN – Latavius Murray 29-yard run (Kai Forbath kick no good), 7:58. Vikings 18–6. **Drive: 3 plays, 45 yards, 1:21.**
- BAL – Justin Tucker 47-yard field goal, 2:58. Vikings 18–9. **Drive: 10 plays, 46 yards, 5:00.**

**Fourth quarter**

- MIN – Kai Forbath 34-yard field goal, 11:54. Vikings 21–9. **Drive: 6 plays, 35 yards, 2:15.**
- MIN – Kai Forbath 32-yard field goal, 3:03. Vikings 24–9. **Drive: 12 plays, 64 yards, 6:47.**
- BAL – Chris Moore 13-yard pass from Joe Flacco (Justin Tucker kick good), 0:00. Vikings 24–16. **Drive: 14 plays, 68 yards, 3:03.**

**Top passers**

- BAL – Joe Flacco – 27/39, 186 yards, TD
- MIN – Case Keenum – 20/31, 188 yards, INT

**Top rushers**

- BAL – Alex Collins – 10 rushes, 30 yards
- MIN – Latavius Murray – 18 rushes, 113 yards, TD

**Top receivers**

- BAL – Benjamin Watson – 5 receptions, 38 yards
- MIN – Jarius Wright – 3 receptions, 54 yards

==== Week 8: Baltimore Ravens 40, Miami Dolphins 0 ====
Week Eight: Miami Dolphins at Baltimore Ravens – Game summary

Quarter	1	2	3	4	Total
Dolphins	0	0	0	0	**0**
**Ravens**	7	13	0	20	**40**

at M&T Bank Stadium, Baltimore, Maryland

- Date: October 26
- Game time: 8:26 pm. EDT
- Game weather: 56 °F (13 °C), partly cloudy
- Game attendance: 70,408
- Referee: John Parry
- TV announcers (CBS/NFLN/Amazon Video): Jim Nantz, Tony Romo, Tracy Wolfson, and Jay Feely
- Recap, Gamebook

Game information

**First quarter**

- BAL – Jeremy Maclin 34-yard pass From Joe Flacco (Justin Tucker kick good), 8:25. Ravens 7–0. **Drive: 3 plays, 40 yards, 0:50.**

**Second quarter**

- BAL – Justin Tucker 55-yard field goal, 13:21. Ravens 10–0. **Drive: 7 plays, 35 yards, 2:51.**
- BAL – Justin Tucker 48-yard field goal, 8:07. Ravens 13–0. **Drive: 8 plays, 30 yards, 3:48.**
- BAL – Benjamin Watson 2-yard pass from Ryan Mallett (Justin Tucker kick good), 8:56. Ravens 20–0. **Drive: 8 plays, 60 yards, 3:04.**

**Third quarter**

- No scoring plays.

**Fourth quarter**

- BAL – C. J. Mosley 63-yard interception return (Ryan Mallett pass failed), 14:29. Ravens 26–0.
- BAL – Chris Moore fumble recovery in end zone (Justin Tucker kick good), 6:39. Ravens 33–0. **Drive:8 plays, 38 yards, 4:44.**
- BAL – Jimmy Smith 50-yard interception return (Justin Tucker kick good), 4:28. Ravens 40–0.

**Top passers**

- MIA – Matt Moore – 25/44, 176 yards, 2 INT
- BAL – Joe Flacco – 10/15, 101 yards, TD

**Top rushers**

- MIA – Jay Ajayi – 13 rushes, 23 yards
- BAL – Alex Collins – 18 rushes, 113 yards

**Top receivers**

- MIA – Kenny Stills – 5 receptions, 65 yards
- BAL – Jeremy Maclin – 3 receptions, 53 yards, TD

The Ravens put out their largest point total of the season despite a combined 121 passing yards from Joe Flacco and Ryan Mallett. The Ravens defense forced an end zone fumble and scored twice on interceptions in the fourth quarter. With the game completely in hand the appearance of a stray cat on the field past the two-minute warning caused some amusement in the CBS Sports television booth.

==== Week 9: Tennessee Titans 23, Baltimore Ravens 20 ====
Week Nine: Baltimore Ravens at Tennessee Titans – Game summary

Quarter	1	2	3	4	Total
Ravens	3	3	0	14	**20**
**Titans**	10	6	0	7	**23**

at Nissan Stadium, Nashville, Tennessee

- Date: November 5
- Game time: 1:02 pm. EST/12:02 pm. CST
- Game weather: 75 °F (24 °C), cloudy
- Game attendance: 67,322
- Referee: John Hussey
- TV announcers (CBS): Kevin Harlan, Rich Gannon, and Melanie Collins
- Recap, Gamebook

Game information

**First quarter**

- TEN – Ryan Succop 48-yard field goal, 11:04. Titans 3–0. **Drive: 7 plays, 45 yards, 4:02.**
- BAL – Justin Tucker 30-yard field goal, 6:03. Tied 3–3. **Drive: 12 plays, 63 yards, 4:59.**
- TEN – Rishard Matthews 16-yard pass from Marcus Mariota (Ryan Succop kick good), 4:04. Titans 10–3. **Drive: 3 plays, 46 yards, 1:21.**

**Second quarter**

- BAL – Justin Tucker 49-yard field goal, 10:01. Titans 10–6. **Drive: 13 plays, 44 yards, 6:08.**
- TEN – Derrick Henry 1-yard run (Ryan Succop kick no good), 2:24. Titans 16–6. **Drive: 7 plays, 26 yards, 3:10.**

**Third quarter**

- No scoring plays.

**Fourth quarter**

- BAL – Javorius Allen 3-yard pass form Joe Flacco (Justin Tucker kick good), 8:56. Titans 16–13. **Drive: 6 plays, 42 yards, 2:55.**
- TEN – Eric Decker 11-yard pass form Marcus Mariota (Ryan Succop kick good), 4:04. Titans 23–13. **Drive: 9 plays, 75 yards, 4:58.**
- BAL – Mike Wallace 1-yard pass from Joe Flacco (Justin Tucker kick good), 0:46. Titans 23–20. **Drive: 16 plays, 75 yards, 3:12.**

**Top passers**

- BAL – Joe Flacco – 34/52, 261 yards, 2 TD, 2 INT
- TEN – Marcus Mariota – 19/28, 218 yards, 2 TD, INT

**Top rushers**

- BAL – Alex Collins – 13 rushes, 43 yards
- TEN – Derrick Henry – 8 rushes, 26 yards, TD

**Top receivers**

- BAL – Jeremy Maclin – 8 receptions, 98 yards
- TEN – Delanie Walker – 5 receptions, 71 yards

This was the seventh straight game in the rivalry between the two clubs in which the winner alternated, a streak that was still active entering 2020.

==== Week 11: Baltimore Ravens 23, Green Bay Packers 0 ====
Week Eleven: Baltimore Ravens at Green Bay Packers – Game summary

Quarter	1	2	3	4	Total
**Ravens**	0	6	7	10	**23**
Packers	0	0	0	0	**0**

at Lambeau Field, Green Bay, Wisconsin

- Date: November 19
- Game time: 1:02 pm. EST/12:02 pm. CST
- Game weather: 28 °F (−2 °C), sunny
- Game attendance: 77,945
- Referee: Jeff Triplette
- TV announcers (CBS): Kevin Harlan, Rich Gannon, and Jenny Dell
- Recap, Gamebook

Game information

**First quarter**

- No scoring plays.

**Second quarter**

- BAL – Justin Tucker 32-yard field goal, 15:00. Ravens 3–0. **Drive: 10 plays, 47 yards, 4:51.**
- BAL – Justin Tucker 39-yard field goal, 0:03. Ravens 6–0. **Drive: 4 plays, 9 yards, 1:37.**

**Third quarter**

- BAL – Mike Wallace 21-yard pass from Joe Flacco (Justin Tucker kick), 13:08. Ravens 13–0. **Drive: 4 plays, 59 yards, 1:52.**

**Fourth quarter**

- BAL – Justin Tucker 23-yard field goal, 4:50. Ravens 16–0. **Drive: 5 plays, 24 yards, 1:57.**
- BAL – Alex Collins 3-yard run (Justin Tucker kick), 2:12. Ravens 23–0. **Drive: 1 play, 3 yards, 0:05.**

**Top passers**

- BAL – Joe Flacco – 22/28, 183 yards, TD, INT
- GB – Brett Hundley – 21/36, 239 yards, 3 INT

**Top rushers**

- BAL – Alex Collins – 20 rushes, 49 yards, TD
- GB – Jamaal Williams – 18 rushes, 57 yards

**Top receivers**

- BAL – Mike Wallace – 4 receptions, 56 yards, TD
- GB – Davante Adams – 8 receptions, 126 yards

The Ravens came into Lambeau Field having never won a game with a 0–3 record there. However, they forced five turnovers off a Packers offense struggling greatly without injured star quarterback Aaron Rodgers, which proved costly as the Ravens got their third shutout of the season 23–0, their first ever win in Wisconsin.

==== Week 12: Baltimore Ravens 23, Houston Texans 16 ====
Week Twelve: Houston Texans at Baltimore Ravens – Game summary

Quarter	1	2	3	4	Total
Texans	7	3	3	3	**16**
**Ravens**	0	17	0	6	**23**

at M&T Bank Stadium, Baltimore, Maryland

- Date: November 27
- Game time: 8:30 pm. EST
- Game weather: 50 °F (10 °C), fair
- Game attendance: 70,357
- Referee: Brad Allen
- TV announcers (ESPN): Sean McDonough, Jon Gruden, and Lisa Salters
- Recap, Gamebook

Game information

**First quarter**

- HOU – Lamar Miller 4-yard run (Kaʻimi Fairbairn kick), 8:49. Texans 7–0. **Drive: 9 plays, 90 yards, 5:25.**

**Second quarter**

- BAL – Javorius Allen 10-yard run (Justin Tucker kick), 11:10. Tied 7–7. **Drive: 7 plays, 50 yards, 3:12.**
- BAL – Alex Collins 8-yard run (Justin Tucker kick), 6:44. Ravens 14–7. **Drive: 5 plays, 46 yards, 2:26.**
- HOU – Kaʻimi Fairbairn 25-yard field goal, 1:52. Ravens 14–10. **Drive: 13 plays, 68 yards, 4:56.**
- BAL – Justin Tucker 53-yard field goal, 0:12. Ravens 17–10. **Drive: 11 plays, 48 yards, 1:41.**

**Third quarter**

- HOU – Kaʻimi Fairbairn 36-yard field goal, 4:40. Ravens 17–13. **Drive" 13 plays, 65 yards, 6:20.**

**Fourth quarter**

- BAL – Justin Tucker 31-yard field goal, 10:59. Ravens 20–13. **Drive: 10 plays, 36 yards, 5:27.**
- HOU – Kaʻimi Fairbairn 37-yard field goal, 8:40. Ravens 20–16. **Drive: 7 plays, 56 yards, 2:18.**
- BAL – Justin Tucker 49-yard field goal,2:58. Ravens 23–16. **Drive: 6 plays, 18 yards, 1:51.**

**Top passers**

- HOU – Tom Savage – 22/37, 252 yards, 2 INT
- BAL – Joe Flacco – 20/32, 141 yards

**Top rushers**

- HOU – Lamar Miller – 17 rushes, 51 yards, TD
- BAL – Alex Collins – 16 rushes, 60 yards, TD

**Top receivers**

- HOU – DeAndre Hopkins – 7 receptions, 125 yards
- BAL – Mike Wallace – 5 receptions, 48 yards

==== Week 13: Baltimore Ravens 44, Detroit Lions 20 ====
Week Thirteen: Detroit Lions at Baltimore Ravens – Game summary

Quarter	1	2	3	4	Total
Lions	0	0	13	7	**20**
**Ravens**	3	17	0	24	**44**

at M&T Bank Stadium, Baltimore, Maryland

- Date: December 3
- Game time: 1:02 pm. EST
- Game weather: 53 °F (12 °C), partly sunny
- Game attendance: 70,500
- Referee: Jerome Boger
- TV announcers (Fox): Thom Brennaman, Chris Spielman, and Peter Schrager
- Recap, Gamebook

Game information

**First quarter**

- BAL – Justin Tucker 38-yard field goal, 6:01. Ravens 3–0. **Drive: 8 plays, 28 yards, 3:49.**

**Second quarter**

- BAL – Benjamin Watson 1-yard pass from Joe Flacco (Justin Tucker kick), 11:52. Ravens 10–0. **Drive: 2 plays, 67 yards, 0:58.**
- BAL – Patrick Ricard 3-yard pass from Joe Flacco (Justin Tucker kick), 6:54. Ravens 17–0. **Drive: 7 plays, 36 yards, 2:48.**
- BAL – Justin Tucker 46-yard field goal, 0:05. Ravens 20–0. **Drive: 3 plays, 17 yards, 0:17.**

**Third quarter**

- DET – Theo Riddick 4-yard run (Matt Prater kick), 12:11. Ravens 20–7. **Drive: 7 plays, 75 yards, 2:49.**
- DET – Tion Green 4-yard run (Matt Prater kick missed), 2:23. Ravens 20–13. **Drive: 7 plays, 75 yards, 4:08.**

**Fourth quarter**

- BAL – Alex Collins 7-yard run (Justin Tucker kick), 12:46. Ravens 27–13. **Drive: 9 plays, 74 yards, 4:36.**
- DET – Nick Bellore 1-yard pass from Matthew Stafford (Matt Prater kick), 10:20. Ravens 27–20. **Drive: 5 plays, 75 yards, 2:19.**
- BAL – Justin Tucker 51-yard field goal, 6:59. Ravens 30–20. **Drive: 7 plays, 23 yards, 3:26.**
- BAL – Alex Collins 6-yard run (Justin Tucker kick), 6:59. Ravens 37–20. **Drive: 4 plays, 31 yards, 2:01.**
- BAL – Eric Weddle 45-yard interception return (Justin Tucker kick), 2:26. Ravens 44–20.

**Top passers**

- DET – Matthew Stafford – 24/29, 292 yards, TD, INT
- BAL – Joe Flacco – 23/36, 269 yards, 2 TD

**Top rushers**

- DET – Tion Green – 11 rushes, 51 yards, TD
- BAL – Alex Collins – 15 rushes, 75 yards, 2 TD

**Top receivers**

- DET – Marvin Jones Jr. – 4 receptions, 90 yards
- BAL – Mike Wallace – 5 receptions, 116 yards

==== Week 14: Pittsburgh Steelers 39, Baltimore Ravens 38 ====
Week Fourteen: Baltimore Ravens at Pittsburgh Steelers – Game summary

Quarter	1	2	3	4	Total
Ravens	0	14	17	7	**38**
**Steelers**	7	13	0	19	**39**

at Heinz Field, Pittsburgh, Pennsylvania

- Date: December 10
- Game time: 8:30 pm. EST
- Game weather: 33 °F (1 °C), cloudy
- Game attendance: 60,069
- Referee: Walt Coleman
- TV announcers (NBC): Al Michaels, Cris Collinsworth, and Michele Tafoya
- Recap, Gamebook

Game information

**First quarter**

- PIT – Le'Veon Bell 20-yard pass from Ben Roethlisberger (Chris Boswell kick), 7:05. Steelers 7–0. **Drive: 8 plays, 59 yards, 3:25.**

**Second quarter**

- PIT – Le'Veon Bell 1-yard run (Chris Boswell kick), 13:16. Steelers 14–0. **Drive: 12 plays, 90 yards, 6:10.**
- BAL – Chris Moore 30-yard pass from Joe Flacco (Justin Tucker kick), 9:14. Steelers 14–7. **Drive: 9 plays, 78 yards, 4:04.**
- PIT – Chris Boswell 52-yard field goal, 4:18. Steelers 17–7. **Drive: 9 plays, 54 yards, 4:53.**
- BAL – Alex Collins 18-yard run (Justin Tucker kick), 2:00. Steelers 17–14. **Drive: 5 plays, 85 yards, 2:21.**
- PIT – Chris Boswell 43-yard field goal, 0:06. Steelers 20–14. **Drive: 11 plays, 50 yards, 1:52.**

**Third quarter**

- BAL – Justin Tucker 47-yard field goal, 10:10. Steelers 20–17. **Drive: 6 plays, 46 yards, 2:07.**
- BAL – Javorius Allen 1-yard run (Justin Tucker kick), 5:23. Ravens 24–20. **Drive: 7 plays, 60 yards, 3:06.**
- BAL – Patrick Ricard 6-yard pass from Joe Flacco (Justin Tucker kick), 2:48. Ravens 31–20. **Drive: 3 plays, 74 yards, 1:13.**

**Fourth quarter**

- PIT – Chris Boswell 24-yard field goal, 12:17. Ravens 31–23. **Drive: 15 plays, 80 yards, 5:27.**
- PIT – Roosevelt Nix 1-yard pass from Ben Roethlisberger (run failed), 9:21. Ravens 31–29. **Drive: 5 plays, 67 yards, 1:14.**
- BAL – Javorius Allen 9-yard run (Justin Tucker kick), 6:52. Ravens 38–29. **Drive: 6 plays, 56 yards, 2:31.**
- PIT – Le'Veon Bell 11-yard run (Chris Boswell kick), 3:36. Ravens 38–36. **Drive: 8 plays, 68 yards, 3:15.**
- PIT – Chris Boswell 46-yard field goal, 0:46. Steelers 39–38. **Drive: 10 plays, 55 yards, 1:43.**

**Top passers**

- BAL – Joe Flacco – 20/35, 269 yards, 2 TD, INT
- PIT – Ben Roethlisberger – 44/66, 506 yards, 2 TD

**Top rushers**

- BAL – Alex Collins – 18 rushes, 120 yards, TD
- PIT – Le'Veon Bell – 13 rushes, 48 yards, 2 TD

**Top receivers**

- BAL – Mike Wallace – 3 receptions, 72 yards
- PIT – Antonio Brown – 11 receptions, 213 yards

==== Week 15: Baltimore Ravens 27, Cleveland Browns 10 ====
Week Fifteen: Baltimore Ravens at Cleveland Browns – Game summary

Quarter	1	2	3	4	Total
**Ravens**	3	14	10	0	**27**
Browns	0	10	0	0	**10**

at FirstEnergy Stadium, Cleveland, Ohio

- Date: December 17
- Game time: 1:01 pm. EST
- Game weather: 36 °F (2 °C), cloudy
- Game attendance: 56,434
- Referee: Clete Blakeman
- TV announcers (CBS): Tom McCarthy, Steve Beuerlein, Steve Tasker, and Melanie Collins
- Recap, Gamebook

Game information

**First quarter**

- BAL – Justin Tucker 31-yard field goal, 8:46. Ravens 3–0. **Drive: 13 plays, 62 yards, 6:14.**

**Second quarter**

- CLE – Duke Johnson 12-yard run (Zane Gonzalez kick), 8:12. Browns 7–3. **Drive: 5 plays, 96 yards, 2:59.**
- BAL – Joe Flacco 2-yard run (Justin Tucker kick), 3:01. Ravens 10–7. **Drive: 11 plays, 75 yards, 5:11.**
- BAL – Benjamin Watson 33-yard pass from Joe Flacco (Justin Tucker kick), 0:59. Ravens 17–7. **Drive: 3 plays, 45 yards, 0:37.**
- CLE – Zane Gonzalez 45-yard field goal, 0:00. Ravens 17–10. **Drive: 7 plays, 47 yards, 0:59.**

**Third quarter**

- BAL – Brandon Williams 1-yard fumble return (Justin Tucker kick), 7:06. Ravens 24–10.
- BAL – Justin Tucker 43-yard field goal, 0:04. Ravens 27–10. **Drive: 8 plays, 36 yards, 3:13.**

**Fourth quarter**

- No scoring plays.

**Top passers**

- BAL – Joe Flacco – 26/42, 288 yards, TD
- CLE – DeShone Kizer – 20/37, 146 yards, 2 INT

**Top rushers**

- BAL – Javorius Allen – 13 rushes, 70 yards
- CLE – Isaiah Crowell – 5 rushes, 72 yards

**Top receivers**

- BAL – Mike Wallace – 6 receptions, 89 yards
- CLE – Josh Gordon – 5 receptions, 47 yards

==== Week 16: Baltimore Ravens 23, Indianapolis Colts 16 ====
Week Sixteen: Indianapolis Colts at Baltimore Ravens – Game summary

Quarter	1	2	3	4	Total
Colts	0	7	6	3	**16**
**Ravens**	3	10	3	7	**23**

at M&T Bank Stadium, Baltimore, Maryland

- Date: December 23
- Game time: 4:30 pm. EST
- Game weather: 63 °F (17 °C), cloudy, light rain
- Game attendance: 70,590
- Referee: Tony Corrente
- TV announcers (NFLN): Greg Gumbel, Trent Green, and Jamie Erdahl
- Recap, Gamebook

Game information

**First quarter**

- BAL – Justin Tucker 30-yard field goal, 6:38. Ravens 3–0. **Drive: 14 plays, 52 yards, 7:30.**

**Second quarter**

- BAL – Michael Campanaro 6-yard pass from Joe Flacco (Justin Tucker kick), 12:19. Ravens 10–0. **Drive: 10 plays, 71 yards, 3:54.**
- IND – Frank Gore 14-yard pass from Jacoby Brissett (Adam Vinatieri kick), 7:38. Ravens 10–7. **Drive: 9 plays, 75 yards, 4:38.**
- BAL – Justin Tucker 39-yard field goal, 2:00. Ravens 13–7. **Drive: 11 plays, 54 yards, 5:43.**

**Third quarter**

- BAL – Justin Tucker 36-yard field goal, 9:29. Ravens 16–7. **Drive: 11 plays, 57 yards, 5:36.**
- IND – Adam Vinatieri 48-yard field goal, 7:18. Ravens 16–10. **Drive: 7 plays, 30 yards, 2:11.**
- IND – Adam Vinatieri 38-yard field goal, 1:38. Ravens 16–13. **Drive: 7 plays, 47 yards, 4:27.**

**Fourth quarter**

- BAL – Maxx Williams 4-yard pass from Joe Flacco (Justin Tucker kick), 8:40. Ravens 23–13. **Drive: 14 plays, 75 yards, 7:54.**
- IND – Adam Vinatieri 30-yard field goal, 4:37. Ravens 23–16. **Drive: 13 plays, 64 yards, 4:07**

**Top passers**

- IND – Jacoby Brissett – 16/33, 215 yards, TD
- BAL – Joe Flacco – 29/38, 237 yards, 2 TD

**Top rushers**

- IND – Frank Gore – 17 rushes, 68 yards
- BAL – Alex Collins – 18 rushes, 51 yards

**Top receivers**

- IND – T. Y. Hilton – 6 receptions, 100 yards
- BAL – Mike Wallace – 4 receptions, 60 yards

==== Week 17: Cincinnati Bengals 31, Baltimore Ravens 27 ====
Week Seventeen: Cincinnati Bengals at Baltimore Ravens – Game summary

Quarter	1	2	3	4	Total
**Bengals**	7	10	7	7	**31**
Ravens	0	10	7	10	**27**

at M&T Bank Stadium, Baltimore, Maryland

- Date: December 31
- Game time: 4:25 pm. EST
- Game weather: 19 °F (−7 °C), cloudy
- Game attendance: 70,507
- Referee: Ronald Torbert
- TV announcers (CBS): Ian Eagle, Dan Fouts, and Evan Washburn
- Recap, Gamebook

Game information

**First quarter**

- CIN – Tyler Kroft 1-yard pass from Andy Dalton (Randy Bullock kick), 10:55. Bengals 7–0. **Drive: 8 plays, 78 yards, 4:05.**

**Second quarter**

- BAL – Justin Tucker 46-yard field goal, 11:18. Bengals 7–3. **Drive: 4 plays, 6 yards, 0:57.**
- CIN – Tyler Kroft 5-yard pass from Andy Dalton (Randy Bullock kick), 4:14. Bengals 14–3. **Drive: 9 plays, 72 yards, 3:58.**
- CIN – Randy Bullock 32-yard field goal, 0:26. Bengals 17–3. **Drive: 12 plays, 63 yards, 2:59.**
- BAL – Chris Moore 6-yard pass from Joe Flacco (Justin Tucker kick), 0:08. Bengals 17–10. **Drive: 1 play, 6 yards, 0:19.**

**Third quarter**

- CIN – Darqueze Dennard 89-yard interception return (Randy Bullock kick), 10:36. Bengals 24–10.
- BAL – Alex Collins 17-yard run (Justin Tucker kick), 6:16. Bengals 24–17. **Drive: 8 plays, 61 yards, 4:01.**

**Fourth quarter**

- BAL – Justin Tucker 34-yard field goal, 13:12. Bengals 24–20. **Drive: 14 plays, 62 yards, 5:55.**
- BAL – Mike Wallace 6-yard pass from Joe Flacco (Justin Tucker kick), 8:48. Ravens 27–24. **Drive: 7 plays, 45 yards, 3:17.**
- CIN – Tyler Boyd 49-yard pass from Andy Dalton (Randy Bullock kick), 0:44. Bengals 31–27. **Drive: 11 plays, 90 yards, 1:59.**

**Top passers**

- CIN – Andy Dalton – 23/44, 222 yards, 3 TD
- BAL – Joe Flacco – 25/47, 203 yards, 2 TD, INT

**Top rushers**

- CIN – Joe Mixon – 18 rushes, 96 yards
- BAL – Alex Collins – 20 rushes, 78 yards, TD

**Top receivers**

- CIN – Tyler Boyd – 5 receptions, 91 yards, TD
- BAL – Benjamin Watson – 7 receptions, 61 yards

The Ravens' playoff dreams were dashed in heartbreaking fashion after Eric Weddle's would be game-winning interception was negated by a defensive pass interference call, in which the drive ended with a go-ahead Bengals touchdown. After a 4th down Flacco pass to Wallace that failed to convert into a 1st down, the Ravens turned over the ball and lost to the Bengals. This loss would be significant because in addition to eliminating them from the playoffs, it allowed the Buffalo Bills to make the playoffs for the first time since the 1999 season.

=== Standings ===
==== Division ====
AFC North
	W	L	T	PCT	DIV	CONF	PF	PA	STK
^{(2)} Pittsburgh Steelers	13	3	0	.813	6–0	10–2	406	308	W2
Baltimore Ravens	9	7	0	.563	3–3	7–5	395	303	L1
Cincinnati Bengals	7	9	0	.438	3–3	6–6	290	349	W2
Cleveland Browns	0	16	0	.000	0–6	0–12	234	410	L16

==== Conference ====
AFC
#	Team	Division	W	L	T	PCT	DIV	CONF	SOS	SOV	STK
**Division leaders**
1 (Note: New England claimed the No. 1 seed over Pittsburgh based on head-to-head victory.)	New England Patriots	East	13	3	0	.813	5–1	10–2	.484	.466	W3
2	Pittsburgh Steelers	North	13	3	0	.813	6–0	10–2	.453	.423	W2
3 (Note: Jacksonville claimed the No. 3 seed over Kansas City based on conference record.)	Jacksonville Jaguars	South	10	6	0	.625	4–2	9–3	.434	.394	L2
4	Kansas City Chiefs	West	10	6	0	.625	5–1	8–4	.477	.481	W4
**Wild Cards**
5 (Note: Tennessee finished ahead of Buffalo, Baltimore and Los Angeles Chargers based on conference record, claiming the No. 5 seed. Buffalo and Baltimore finished ahead of Los Angeles Chargers based on conference record. Buffalo claimed the No. 6 seed over Baltimore based on strength of victory.)	Tennessee Titans	South	9	7	0	.563	5–1	8–4	.434	.396	W1
6	Buffalo Bills	East	9	7	0	.563	3–3	7–5	.492	.396	W1
**Did not qualify for the postseason**
7	Baltimore Ravens	North	9	7	0	.563	3–3	7–5	.441	.299	L1
8	Los Angeles Chargers	West	9	7	0	.563	3–3	6–6	.457	.347	W2
9	Cincinnati Bengals	North	7	9	0	.438	3–3	6–6	.465	.321	W2
10 (Note: Oakland finished ahead of Miami based on head-to-head victory.)	Oakland Raiders	West	6	10	0	.375	2–4	5–7	.512	.396	L4
11	Miami Dolphins	East	6	10	0	.375	2–4	5–7	.543	.531	L3
12 (Note: Denver finished ahead of the New York Jets based on head-to-head victory.)	Denver Broncos	West	5	11	0	.313	2–4	4–8	.492	.413	L2
13	New York Jets	East	5	11	0	.313	2–4	5–7	.520	.438	L4
14 (Note: Indianapolis finished ahead of Houston based on head-to-head sweep.)	Indianapolis Colts	South	4	12	0	.250	2–4	3–9	.480	.219	W1
15	Houston Texans	South	4	12	0	.250	1–5	3–9	.516	.375	L6
16	Cleveland Browns	North	0	16	0	.000	0–6	0–12	.520	–	L16
**Tiebreakers** (Note: When breaking ties for three or more teams under the NFL's rules, they are first broken within divisions, then comparing only the highest ranked remaining team from each division.)
