= Tim Williams (American football) =

American football player (born 1993)

No. 56, 47
- Position: Defensive end

Personal information
- Born: November 12, 1993 (age 32); Baton Rouge, Louisiana, U.S.
- Listed height: 6 ft 3 in (1.91 m)
- Listed weight: 244 lb (111 kg)

Career information
- High school: LSU Lab (Baton Rouge)
- College: Alabama
- NFL draft: 2017: 3rd round, 78th overall pick

Career history
- Baltimore Ravens (2017–2019); Green Bay Packers (2019); Seattle Seahawks (2020)*; Saskatchewan Roughriders (2021); BC Lions (2022)
- * Offseason or practice squad member only

Awards and highlights
- CFP national champion (2015); Second-team All-SEC (2016)

Career NFL statistics
- Total tackles: 18
- Sacks: 2
- Stats at Pro Football Reference
- Stats at CFL.ca

Timothy Williams (born November 12, 1993) is an American former professional football player who was a defensive end in the National Football League (NFL). He played college football for the Alabama Crimson Tide. He was selected by the Baltimore Ravens in the third round of the 2017 NFL draft.

== Early life ==
Williams attended Louisiana State University Laboratory School in Baton Rouge, Louisiana. He was rated by Rivals.com as a four-star recruit and committed to the University of Alabama to play college football.

== College career ==
Williams was a backup his first two years at Alabama in 2013 and 2014. He appeared in 19 games, recording eight tackles and 1.5 sacks. As a junior in 2015, Williams appeared in all 15 games and had 19 tackles and 10.5 sacks. He considered entering the 2016 NFL draft, but decided to return for his senior year.

== Professional career ==
=== Pre-draft ===
He received an invitation to the 2017 Senior Bowl, along with teammates O. J. Howard, Dalvin Tomlinson, Cole Mazza, Reuben Foster, and Ryan Anderson. Unfortunately, Williams had to pull out of the Senior Bowl due to an elbow injury. Williams received an invitation to the NFL Combine as a top linebacker prospect and completed the majority of combine drills, but was unable to perform the bench press due to his elbow injury. On March 8, 2017, Williams participated at Alabama's pro day, along with teammates Jonathan Allen, O.J. Howard, Ryan Anderson, Dalvin Tomlinson, Cole Mazza, Marlon Humphrey, Cam Robinson, ArDarius Stewart, and 18 others. Team representatives and scouts from all 32 NFL teams attended, including head coaches Todd Bowles (New York Jets), Bill Belichick (New England Patriots), Pete Carroll (Seattle Seahawks), and Pittsburgh Steelers general manager Kevin Colbert. Williams opted to stand on his combine performance and only ran positional drills.

Pre-draft measurables
Height	Weight	Arm length	Hand span	40-yard dash	10-yard split	20-yard split	20-yard shuttle	Three-cone drill	Vertical jump	Broad jump
6 ft 2 7/8 in (1.90 m)	244 lb (111 kg)	32 3/4 in (0.83 m)	9 1/4 in (0.23 m)	4.68 s	1.64 s	2.73 s	4.57 s	7.36 s	33.5 in (0.85 m)	10 ft 4 in (3.15 m)
All values from NFL Combine

=== Baltimore Ravens ===
The Baltimore Ravens selected Williams in the third round (78th overall) of the 2017 NFL draft. On May 5, 2017, the Ravens signed Williams to a four-year, $3.25 million contract with a signing bonus of $856,680.

He competed with Terrell Suggs, Albert McClellan, Matthew Judon, Tyus Bowser, Za'Darius Smith, and Boseko Lokombo throughout training camp for the starting outside linebacker job left by the departure of Elvis Dumervil during free agency. Head coach John Harbaugh named Williams the third weakside linebacker on the Ravens' depth chart behind Suggs and Smith.

He was unable to play in the Ravens' season -opening victory over the Cincinnati Bengals due to an unspecified illness. On September 17, 2017, Williams made his professional regular season debut against the Cleveland Browns and made the first tackle of his career in the Ravens' 24–10 victory. He missed five games (Weeks 6–9) due to a thigh injury. Williams returned during the Ravens' Week 11 contest at the Green Bay Packers and recorded two combined tackles in their 23–0 victory.

On October 1, 2019, Williams was released by the Ravens.

=== Green Bay Packers ===
On October 2, 2019, Williams was claimed off waivers by the Packers. He was waived on November 5, 2019. Two days later, he was signed to the practice squad. He signed a reserve/future contract with the Packers on January 21, 2020.

Williams was waived on September 5, 2020.

=== Seattle Seahawks ===
On September 30, 2020, Williams was signed to the Seattle Seahawks practice squad. He was released on October 13, 2020.

=== Saskatchewan Roughriders ===
On January 15, 2021, it was announced that Williams had signed with the Saskatchewan Roughriders. Williams tore his Achilles in July 2021. Williams was released February 21, 2022 without seeing any game action.

=== BC Lions ===
On April 7, 2022, Williams signed with the BC Lions. On November 22, 2022, he was transferred to the suspended list.

== NFL career statistics ==
Regular season statistics
Year	Team	GP	GS	Tackles					Interceptions						Fumbles	
Year	Team	GP	GS	Total	Solo	Ast	Sck	SFTY	PDef	Int	Yds	Avg	Lng	TDs	FF	FR
2017	BAL	8	0	6	5	1	0.0	0	0	0	0	0	0	0	0	0
2018	BAL	7	0	10	6	4	2.0	0	0	0	0	0	0	0	0	1
2019	BAL	4	0	2	2	0	0.0	0	0	0	0	0	0	0	0	0
2019	GB	1	0	0	0	0	0.0	0	0	0	0	0	0	0	0	0
Total		20	0	18	13	5	2.0	0	0	0	0	0	0	0	0	0

== Personal life ==
On September 29, 2016, Williams was arrested by Alabama's campus police for a misdemeanor charge of carrying a pistol without a permit. University of Alabama Police Department's report showed that his arrest took place at 1 am in William's vehicle.
