= Chris Moore (American football) =

American football player (born 1993)

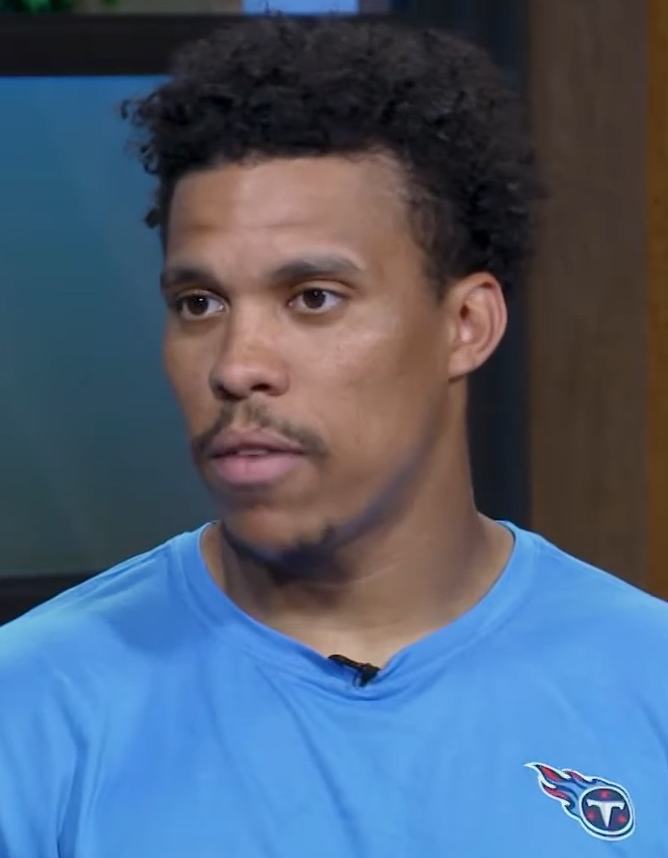
- Moore with the Tennessee Titans in 2024

No. 17 – Baltimore Ravens
- Position: Wide receiver
- Roster status: Practice squad

Personal information
- Born: June 16, 1993 (age 33); Tampa, Florida, U.S.
- Listed height: 6 ft 1 in (1.85 m)
- Listed weight: 200 lb (91 kg)

Career information
- High school: Thomas Jefferson (Tampa)
- College: Cincinnati (2011–2015)
- NFL draft: 2016: 4th round, 107th overall pick

Career history
- Baltimore Ravens (2016–2020); Houston Texans (2021–2022); Tennessee Titans (2023); Arizona Cardinals (2024); Washington Commanders (2024–2025); Baltimore Ravens (2026–present)

Career NFL statistics as of Week 5, 2026
- Receptions: 152
- Receiving yards: 1,980
- Return yards: 1,555
- Total touchdowns: 13
- Stats at Pro Football Reference

Christopher Moore (born June 16, 1993) is an American professional football wide receiver of the Baltimore Ravens for the National Football League (NFL). He played college football for the Cincinnati Bearcats and was selected by the Baltimore Ravens in the fourth round of the 2016 NFL draft. Moore has also been a member of the Houston Texans, Tennessee Titans, Arizona Cardinals, and Washington Commanders.

== Early life ==
Moore attended and played high school football at Thomas Jefferson High School. A 3-star wide receiver recruit, he committed to Cincinnati to play college football over offers from Illinois, Michigan State, Texas Tech, and West Virginia.

== College career ==
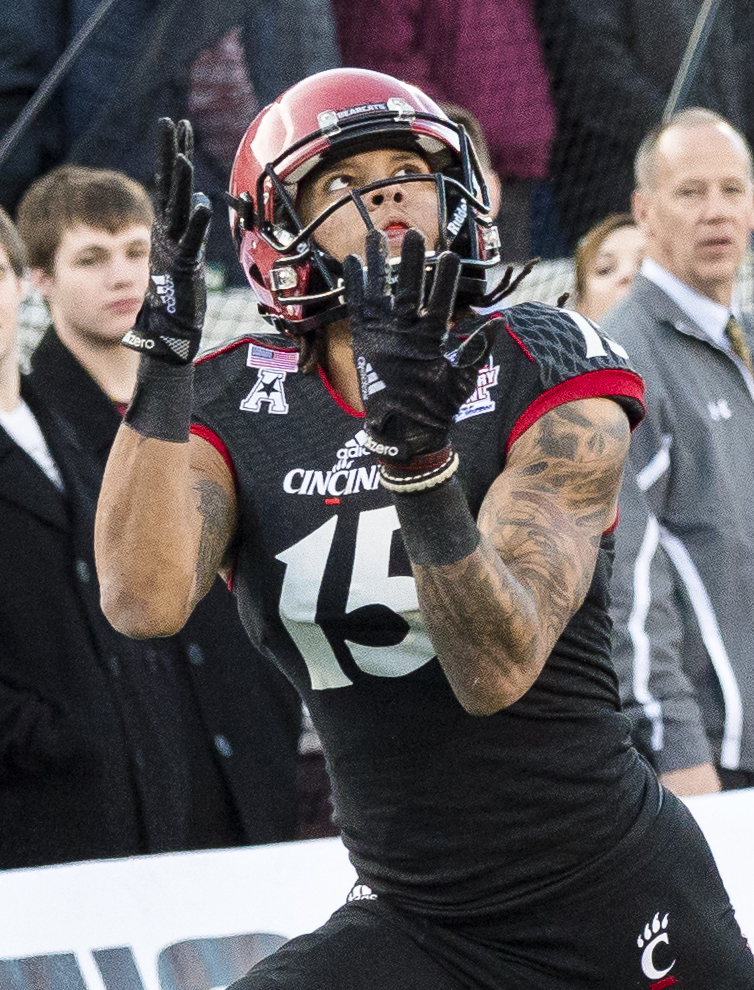
Moore with the Cincinnati Bearcats in 2014.

Moore redshirted as a freshman in 2011. He played in 50 games at Cincinnati as a wide receiver and special teamer from 2012-2015, finishing his college career with 119 receptions for 2,301 yards and 26 touchdowns.

Statistics
Year	School	G	Receiving			
Year	School	G	Rec	Yds	Avg	TD
2012	Cincinnati	12	4	113	28.3	2
2013	Cincinnati	13	45	645	14.3	9
2014	Cincinnati	11	30	673	22.4	8
2015	Cincinnati	11	40	870	21.8	7
Career		47	119	2,301	19.3	26

== Professional career ==
Pre-draft measurables
Height	Weight	Arm length	Hand span	Wingspan	40-yard dash	10-yard split	20-yard split	20-yard shuttle	Three-cone drill	Vertical jump	Broad jump	Bench press
6 ft 1 in (1.85 m)	206 lb (93 kg)	33 3/8 in (0.85 m)	9 3/8 in (0.24 m)	6 ft 4 1/8 in (1.93 m)	4.53 s	1.50 s	2.65 s	4.20 s	6.76 s	37.0 in (0.94 m)	10 ft 10 in (3.30 m)	10 reps
All values from NFL Combine

=== Baltimore Ravens (first stint) ===
Moore was selected by the Baltimore Ravens in the fourth round of the 2016 NFL draft with the 107th overall pick. During the 2016 season Moore appeared in 15 games where he had seven catches for 47 yards. In 2017, Moore appeared in 13 games, starting four of them. He finished the 2017 season with 18 catches for 248 yards and three touchdowns. In the 2018 season, Moore recorded 19 receptions for 196 yards and one touchdown. In the 2019 season, he finished the year with three receptions for 21 yards and no touchdowns.

Moore re-signed with the Ravens on a one-year contract on March 26, 2020. He was placed on injured reserve due to a thigh injury on November 7. Moore was activated on December 21. He appeared in three regular season games and one postseason game in the 2020 season.

=== Houston Texans ===
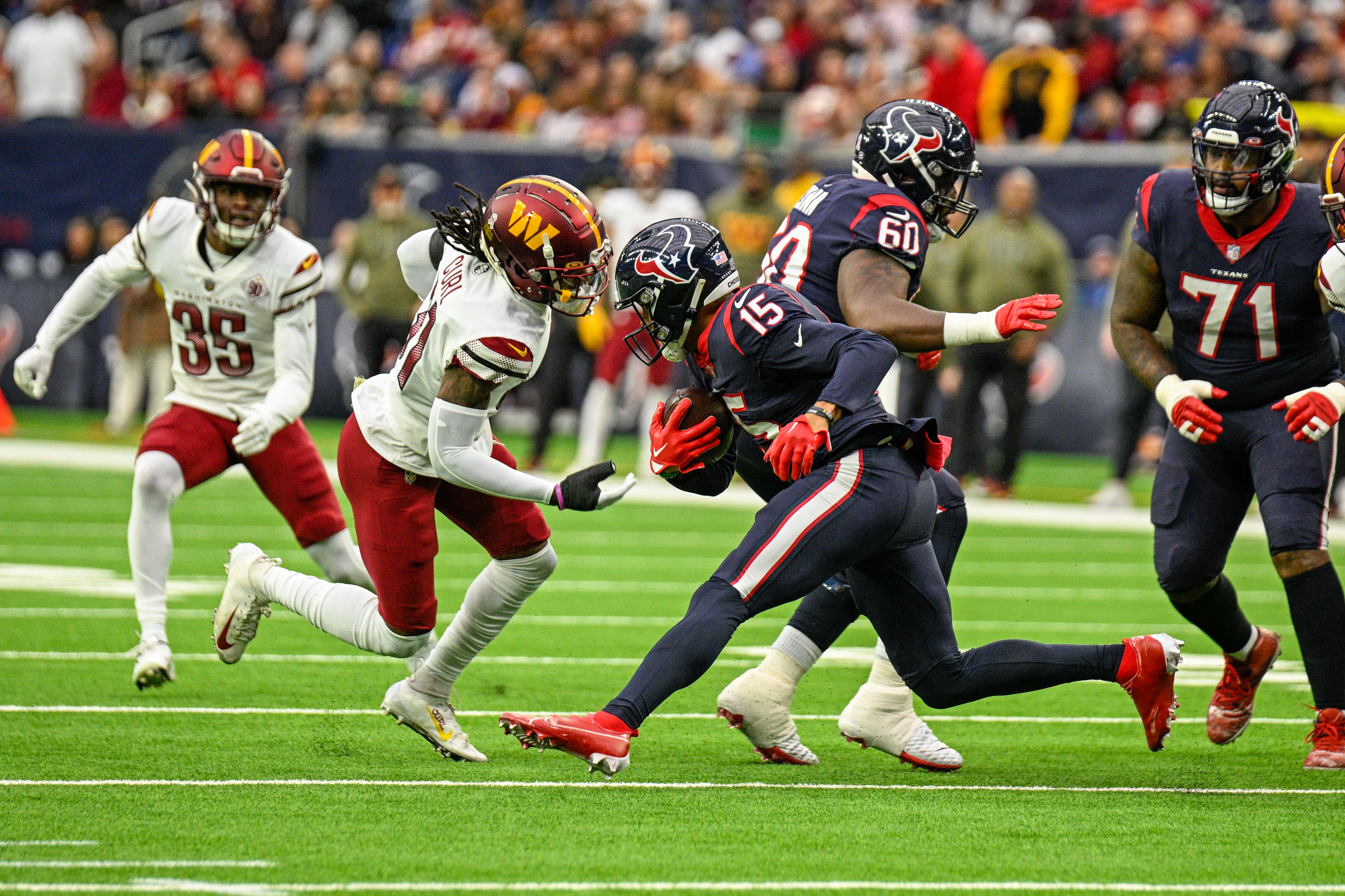
Moore (#15) with the Houston Texans in 2022

On March 24, 2021, Moore signed a one-year contract with the Houston Texans. He was released on August 31, and re-signed to the practice squad. Moore was elevated for the team's Week 5 game, and had a career-high five catches for 109 yards and a touchdown in a 25–22 loss to the New England Patriots. He finished the 2021 season with 21 receptions for 227 yards and two touchdowns. Moore was then signed to the active roster on October 12.

On March 24, 2022, Moore re-signed with the Texans. In Week 14, he had ten receptions for 124 yards in a 27–23 loss to the Dallas Cowboys. For the 2022 season, Moore played in 16 games, starting seven, for Houston and hauled in 48 passes for 548 yards and two touchdowns.

=== Tennessee Titans ===
On April 19, 2023, Moore signed with the Tennessee Titans. He played in 17 games with five starts, recording 22 catches for 424 yards.

=== Arizona Cardinals ===
On March 18, 2024, Moore signed with the Arizona Cardinals. He was released on October 9, and re-signed to the practice squad. In five appearances for Arizona, Moore failed to record a stat, playing 27 offensive snaps. Moore was released by the Cardinals on November 5.

=== Washington Commanders ===
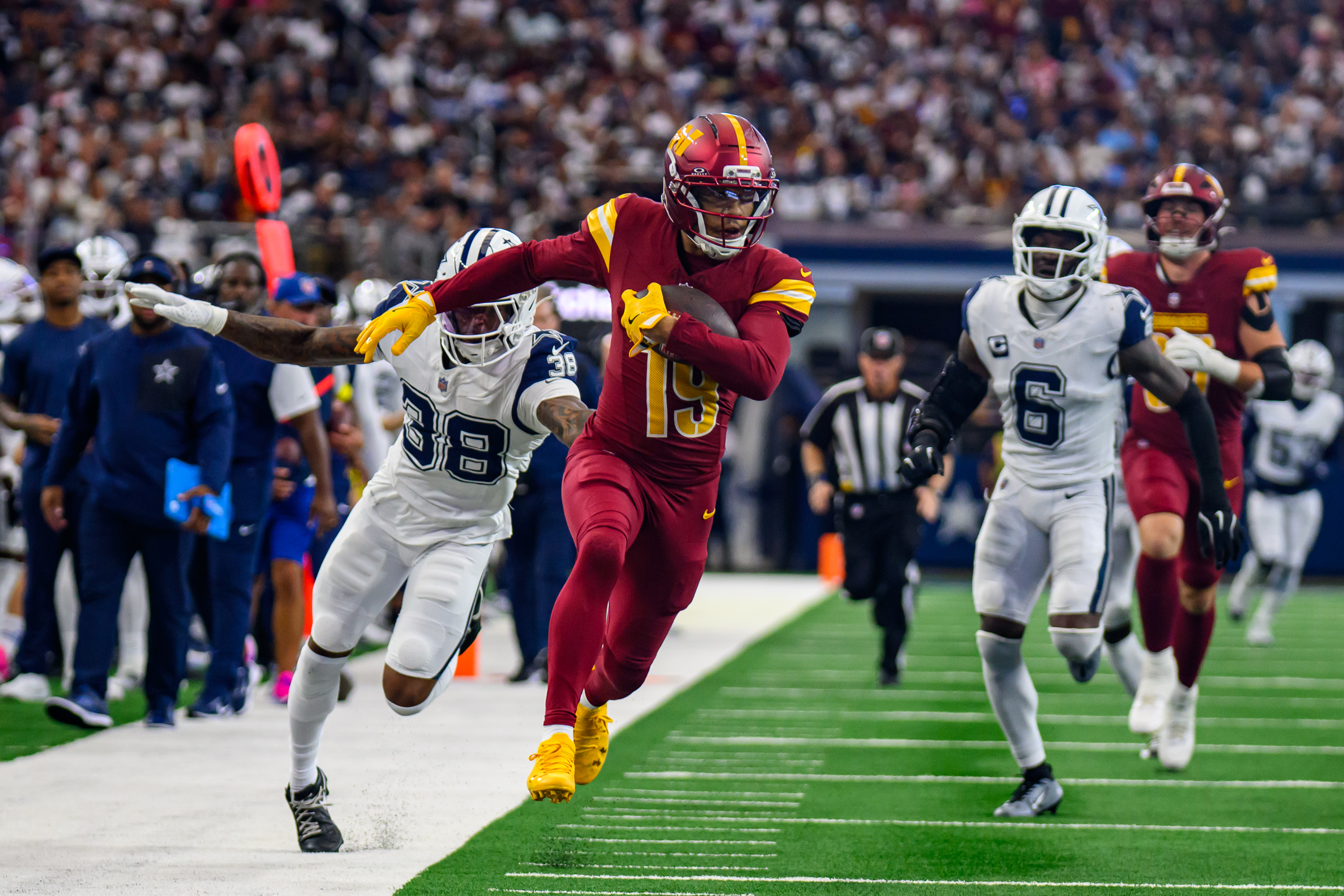
Moore playing against the Dallas Cowboys in 2025

On December 26, 2024, Moore was signed to the Washington Commanders' practice squad. On January 28, 2025, he signed a reserve/future contract with the Commanders. He was waived on August 26, and re-signed with their practice squad the following day. On September 15, the Commanders signed him to their active roster. He played in eleven games (with five starts), recording ten receptions for 192 yards and one touchdown. On December 6, the Commanders waived Moore, and re-signed him to their practice squad three days later. The team promoted Moore to their active roster again on December 16. He finished the 2025 season with 11 receptions for 207 yards and one touchdown.

=== Baltimore Ravens (second stint) ===
On July 24, 2026, Moore was signed to a one-year contract worth $5 million to return to the Baltimore Ravens. He was released by Baltimore on August 29 and was re-signed to the team's practice squad two days later. In the season opener, Moore recorded one catch for 53 yards in the 41–23 win against the Indianapolis Colts. On September 16, Moore was promoted from the practice squad to the Ravens' 53‑man roster, after rookie wide receiver Ja'Kobi Lane was placed on injured reserve following wrist surgery. He was released on October 13, and re-signed to the practice squad.
