= Jaylen Smith (tight end) =

American football player (born 1997)

No. 39
- Position: Tight end

Personal information
- Born: August 1, 1997 (age 29); Pascagoula, Mississippi, U.S.
- Listed height: 6 ft 2 in (1.88 m)
- Listed weight: 227 lb (103 kg)

Career information
- High school: Pascagoula (MS)
- College: Louisville
- NFL draft: 2019: undrafted

Career history
- Baltimore Ravens (2019)*; Toronto Argonauts (2021)*; New England Patriots (2022)*; Seattle Seahawks (2022)*; St. Louis BattleHawks (2023); Orlando Guardians (2023)
- * Offseason or practice squad member only
- Stats at Pro Football Reference

Jaylen Smith (born August 1, 1997) is an American former football tight end. He played college football at Louisville.

== Professional career ==
Pre-draft measurables
Height	Weight	Arm length	Hand span	Wingspan	40-yard dash	10-yard split	20-yard split	20-yard shuttle	Three-cone drill	Vertical jump	Broad jump	Bench press
6 ft 2 1/4 in (1.89 m)	219 lb (99 kg)	33 7/8 in (0.86 m)	9 1/2 in (0.24 m)	6 ft 7 in (2.01 m)	4.47 s	1.52 s	2.64 s	4.48 s	7.02 s	34.5 in (0.88 m)	10 ft 2 in (3.10 m)	14 reps
All values from NFL Combine/Pro Day

=== Baltimore Ravens ===
Smith was not selected in the 2019 NFL draft and was picked up as an undrafted free agent by the Baltimore Ravens. He was waived during final roster cuts on August 30, 2019.

=== Seattle Seahawks ===
On December 31, 2019, Smith was signed to the Seattle Seahawks practice squad. His practice squad contract with the team expired on January 20, 2020.

In October 2019, Smith was selected by the DC Defenders in the open phase of the 2020 XFL draft.

=== Toronto Argonauts ===
Smith signed with the Toronto Argonauts of the CFL on June 18, 2021. On July 27, 2021, Smith was cut by the Argonauts.

=== New England Patriots ===
On January 10, 2022, Smith was signed to the New England Patriots practice squad.

=== St. Louis BattleHawks ===
On November 17, 2022, Smith was drafted by the St. Louis BattleHawks of the XFL. He was placed on the Reserve List after signing with the Seahawks Practice Squad, but was activated off the list shortly after being released.

=== Seattle Seahawks ===
On December 15, 2022, Smith was signed to the Seattle Seahawks' practice squad, but was released two days later.

=== Orlando Guardians ===
Smith was claimed off waivers by the Orlando Guardians of the XFL on March 1, 2023, after being released by the BattleHawks. The Guardians folded when the XFL and USFL merged to create the United Football League (UFL).
