= Gerald Rivers =

American football player

No. 99, 94, 48, 51, 59, 97, 56, 96
- Position: Defensive end

Personal information
- Born: June 22, 1990 (age 36); Ellenwood, Georgia, U.S.
- Listed height: 6 ft 5 in (1.96 m)
- Listed weight: 249 lb (113 kg)

Career information
- College: Ole Miss
- NFL draft: 2013: undrafted

Career history
- St. Louis Rams (2013); Jacksonville Jaguars (2013); Miami Dolphins (2014)*; Denver Broncos (2014–2015)*; New York Giants (2015)*; St. Louis Rams (2015)*; Houston Texans (2015–2016); Edmonton Eskimos (2018); Winnipeg Blue Bombers (2018); Saskatchewan Roughriders (2019)*; Dallas Renegades (2020)
- * Offseason or practice squad member only

Career NFL statistics
- Total tackles: 1
- Stats at Pro Football Reference

Gerald Rivers (born June 22, 1990) is an American former professional football player who was a defensive end in the National Football League (NFL), the Canadian Football League (CFL), and the XFL. He signed with the St. Louis Rams as an undrafted free agent in 2013. He played college football for the Ole Miss Rebels.

== Early life ==
Rivers ranked as the No. 68 DE in the nation by Scout.com and was rated the No. 74 DE in the nation by ESPN.com. Rivers participated in the DeKalb County Coaches Association All-Star game. He posted 81 tackles, nine sacks and two forced fumbles as a senior.

== College career ==
In 2011 Rivers played in every game with five starts and made 13 total tackles and was tied for third on the team with 4.5 TFLs and second with 2.0 sacks. The previous season, 2010, he played in 10 games with five starts and tied for fourth on the team with 2.5 sacks and finished with 14 total tackles, including 3.0 TFLs while earning a second letter. In 2009, he saw action in five games, where he made four stops (three solo) with one TFL on the year and earned first letter.

== Professional career ==
Pre-draft measurables
| Height | Weight | 40-yard dash | 10-yard split | 20-yard split | 20-yard shuttle | Three-cone drill | Vertical jump | Broad jump | Bench press |
|---|---|---|---|---|---|---|---|---|---|
| 6 ft 5 3/4 in (1.97 m) | 248 lb (112 kg) | 4.56 s | 1.59 s | 2.65 s | 4.46 s | 7.19 s | 39 1/2 in (1.00 m) | 10 ft 8 in (3.25 m) | 20 reps |
All values from Regional Pro Day

=== St. Louis Rams ===
Rivers was signed as an undrafted free agent on April 29, 2013, he is signed for 3 years/$1.49 million with the St. Louis Rams. Rivers made the team on August 29. 2013.

He was released by the Rams in December 2013.

=== Jacksonville Jaguars ===
Rivers was claimed off waivers by the Jacksonville Jaguars on December 16, 2013. The Jaguars released Rivers on August 29, 2014.

=== Miami Dolphins ===
On September 2, 2014, Rivers was signed to the Dolphins' practice squad. On September 30, 2014, he was released from practice squad.

=== Denver Broncos ===
On October 15, 2014, Rivers was signed to the Broncos' practice squad. On December 4, 2014, he was released. On December 10, 2014, he was re-signed to the practice squad. On January 12, 2015, he was signed a future contract. On September 5, 2015, he was waived.

=== New York Giants ===
On September 9, 2015, Rivers was signed to the New York Giants practice squad. On September 16, 2015, he was released by the Giants.

=== Second stint with Rams ===
On October 27, 2015, Rivers was signed to the Rams' practice squad. On November 17, 2015, he was released by the Rams.

=== Houston Texans ===
On November 24, 2015 Rivers was signed to the Houston Texans' practice squad. On August 30, 2016, Rivers was placed on injured reserve after a hip injury in preseason.

On April 13, 2017, Rivers was waived by the Texans with failed physical designation.

=== Dallas Renegades ===
In 2019, Rivers joined the Dallas Renegades after being selected by them in the 2020 XFL Draft. He was waived during final roster cuts on January 22, 2020, and re-signed with the team on February 11, 2020. He had his contract terminated when the league suspended operations on April 10, 2020.
