= Jimmy Murray (American football) =

American football player (born 1995)

Profile
- Position: Center

Personal information
- Born: May 5, 1995 (age 31); Wilmette, Illinois, U.S.
- Listed height: 6 ft 5 in (1.96 m)
- Listed weight: 304 lb (138 kg)

Career information
- High school: Loyola Academy (Wilmette)
- College: Holy Cross
- NFL draft: 2018: undrafted

Career history
- Kansas City Chiefs (2018–2019); New York Jets (2019–2021); Tennessee Titans (2021)*; Baltimore Ravens (2021–2022)*; Jacksonville Jaguars (2022–2023)*; Tennessee Titans (2023)*; Jacksonville Jaguars (2023)*
- * Offseason or practice squad member only

Awards and highlights
- 2× Second-team All-Patriot League (2016–2017)

Career NFL statistics
- Games played: 2
- Stats at Pro Football Reference

James Murray (born May 5, 1995) is an American football center. He played college football for the Holy Cross Crusaders.

== College career ==
Murray began his football career at Holy Cross as a walk-on and redshirted his freshman season. He became a four-year starter for the Crusaders, appearing in 44 games and making 40 starts at three positions (center, left tackle, and right guard) on the offensive line. Murray was a second-team All-Patriot League selection during his junior and senior seasons.

== Professional career ==
=== Kansas City Chiefs ===
Murray signed with the Kansas City Chiefs as an undrafted free agent on May 6, 2018. He failed to make the Chiefs' 53-man roster out of training camp but was subsequently signed to the team's practice squad on September 2, 2018. Murray was promoted to the Chiefs' active roster on October 23, 2018 to replace injured center Jordan Devey. Murray made his NFL debut on November 11, 2018 in a 26-14 win against the Arizona Cardinals.

Murray was waived by the Chiefs during final roster cuts on August 31, 2019, but was signed to the team's practice squad the next day. He was released on September 12.

Murray was drafted in the 8th round in phase two of the 2020 XFL draft by the St. Louis BattleHawks, but did not sign with the league.

=== New York Jets ===
On November 6, 2019, Murray was signed to the New York Jets practice squad. He signed a reserve/future contract with the Jets on December 30, 2019.

On September 5, 2020, Murray was waived by the Jets and signed to the practice squad the next day. He was elevated to the active roster on September 26 for the team's week 3 game against the Indianapolis Colts, and reverted to the practice squad after the game. He was promoted to the active roster on October 10. He was waived on November 3 and re-signed to the practice squad two days later. He was signed to the active roster on November 28, 2020.

On August 31, 2021, Murray was waived by the Jets and re-signed to the practice squad the next day. He was released from the practice squad on October 7, 2021.

=== Tennessee Titans (first stint) ===
On October 12, 2021, Murray was signed to the Tennessee Titans practice squad. He was released on October 26, 2021.

=== Baltimore Ravens ===
On December 22, 2021, Murray was signed to the Baltimore Ravens practice squad. He signed a reserve/future contract with the Ravens on January 10, 2022. He was waived on August 29, 2022.

=== Jacksonville Jaguars (first stint) ===
On September 12, 2022, Murray signed with the practice squad of the Jacksonville Jaguars. He signed a reserve/future contract on January 23, 2023. He was waived on May 1, 2023.

=== Tennessee Titans (second stint) ===
On August 2, 2023, Murray signed with the Titans. He was waived on August 27, 2023.

=== Jacksonville Jaguars (second stint) ===
On November 27, 2023, Murray was signed to the practice squad of the Jaguars. He was not signed to a reserve/future contract and thus became a free agent after the season when his practice squad contract expired.
