= Kamalei Correa =

American football player (born 1994)

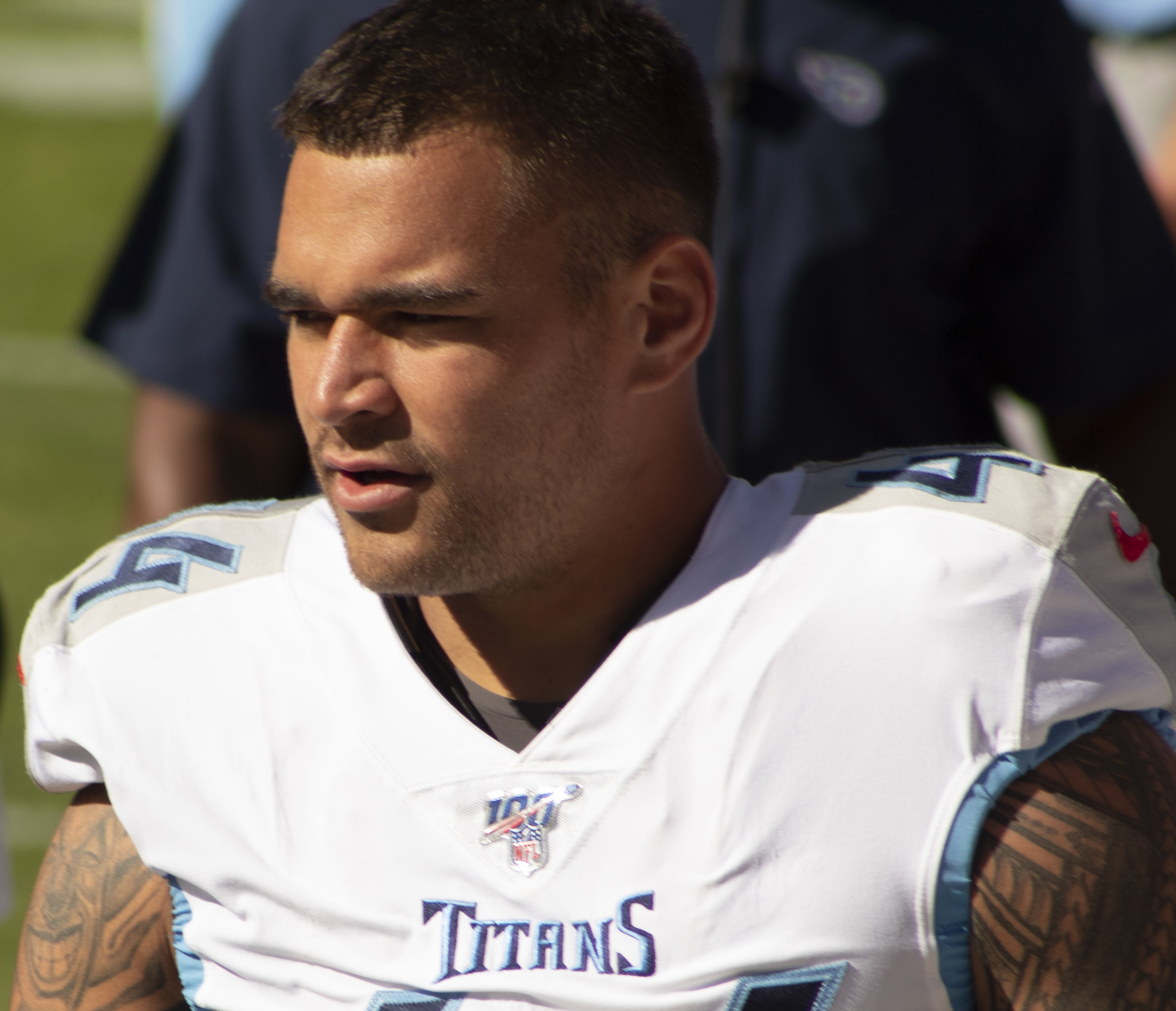
- Correa with the Tennessee Titans in 2019

No. 51, 44, 55, 40
- Position: Linebacker

Personal information
- Born: April 27, 1994 (age 32); Honolulu, Hawaii, U.S.
- Listed height: 6 ft 3 in (1.91 m)
- Listed weight: 241 lb (109 kg)

Career information
- High school: Saint Louis (Honolulu)
- College: Boise State (2013-2015)
- NFL draft: 2016: 2nd round, 42nd overall pick

Career history
- Baltimore Ravens (2016–2017); Tennessee Titans (2018–2020); Jacksonville Jaguars (2020); Kansas City Chiefs (2021)*
- * Offseason or practice squad member only

Awards and highlights
- First-team All-MWC (2014); Second-team All-MWC (2015)

Career NFL statistics
- Total tackles: 84
- Sacks: 8.5
- Forced fumbles: 2
- Fumble recoveries: 1
- Pass deflections: 5
- Stats at Pro Football Reference

Kamalei Correa (/ˈkɑːməleɪ kɒˈreɪə/ KAH-mə-lay korr-AY-ə; born April 27, 1994) is an American former professional football player who was a linebacker in the National Football League (NFL). He played college football for the Boise State Broncos. He was selected by the Baltimore Ravens in the second round of the 2016 NFL draft.

== Early life ==
Correa attended Saint Louis School in Honolulu, Hawaii. He committed to Boise State University to play college football.

== College career ==
As a true freshman at Boise State in 2013, Correa played in all 13 games and had 12 tackles and one sack. As a sophomore in 2014, he started all 14 games and had 59 tackles and a Mountain West Conference leading 12 sacks. As a junior in 2015, he started all 13 games, recording 38 tackles and a team leading seven sacks. In his final collegiate game, he was named the defensive MVP of the 2015 Poinsettia Bowl after recording two sacks. After the season, he entered the 2016 NFL draft.

== Professional career ==
Pre-draft measurables
Height	Weight	Arm length	Hand span	40-yard dash	Vertical jump	Broad jump	Bench press
6 ft 2 5/8 in (1.90 m)	243 lb (110 kg)	31 5/8 in (0.80 m)	9 3/8 in (0.24 m)	4.69 s	33 in (0.84 m)	9 ft 0 in (2.74 m)	21 reps
All values from NFL Combine

=== Baltimore Ravens ===
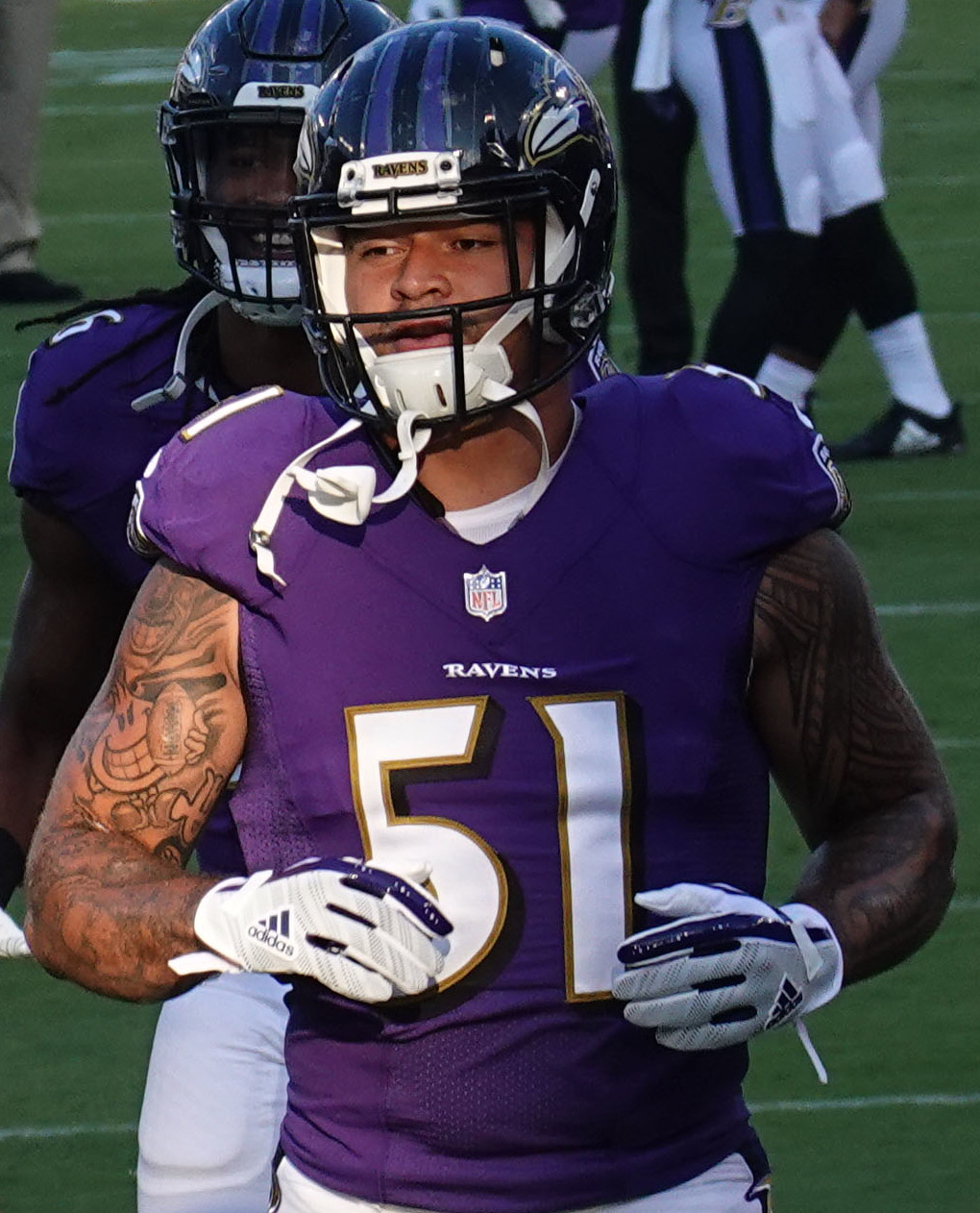
Correa with the Baltimore Ravens in 2018

The Baltimore Ravens selected Correa in the second round (42nd overall) of the 2016 NFL draft. Correa played in nine games making four tackles, a pass defensed, and a forced fumble before being placed on injured reserve on December 24, 2016.

In 2017, Correa played in all 16 games for the first time and notched eight tackles, a pass defended, and seven special teams stops.

=== Tennessee Titans ===
On August 28, 2018, Correa was traded to the Tennessee Titans for a sixth-round pick in the 2019 NFL draft. During a Week 1 27–20 road loss to the Miami Dolphins, Correa registered his first sack as a Titan. In the next game against the Houston Texans, he logged three solo tackles, a sack, and two tackles for a loss as the Titans won 20–17. Correa finished the 2018 season with 19 tackles, 3.5 sacks, and a forced fumble.

During Week 9 against the Carolina Panthers, Correa recorded his first sack of the season as the Titans lost on the road by a score of 30–20. Four weeks later against the Indianapolis Colts, he recorded his second sack and recovered a fumble in the 31–17 road victory. Correa recorded a sack in the next two games against the Oakland Raiders and Texans. Correa finished the regular season with 37 tackles, 5 sacks, two pass deflections, and a fumble recovery. In the playoffs, he recorded two sacks and 13 tackles.

On April 10, 2020, Correa re-signed with the Titans on a one-year deal worth $3.5 million. He was placed on the reserve/COVID-19 list by the team on September 30, 2020, and activated on October 13.

=== Jacksonville Jaguars ===
On October 14, 2020, the Titans traded Correa and a 2021 seventh round pick to the Jacksonville Jaguars in exchange for a sixth round pick. He left the team for personal reasons on December 17, 2020, and was placed on the exempt/left squad list. He was moved to the reserve/left squad list on December 23. On February 11, 2021, Correa was released by the Jaguars.

=== Kansas City Chiefs ===
Correa signed with the Kansas City Chiefs on May 6, 2021. He was released on June 3, 2021.

== NFL career statistics ==
Legend
**Bold**	Career high

=== Regular season ===
Year	Team	Games		Tackles				Interceptions						Fumbles	
Year	Team	GP	GS	Comb	Total	Ast	Sack	PD	INT	Yds	Avg	Lng	TD	FF	FR
2016	BAL	9	1	4	3	1	0.0	1	0	0	0.0	0	0	**1**	0
2017	BAL	16	3	15	10	5	0.0	1	0	0	0.0	0	0	0	0
2018	TEN	13	4	19	12	7	3.5	0	0	0	0.0	0	0	**1**	0
2019	TEN	16	5	**37**	**23**	**10**	**5.0**	**2**	0	0	0.0	0	0	0	**1**
Career		54	13	71	48	23	8.5	4	0	0	0.0	0	0	2	1

=== Postseason ===
Year	Team	Games		Tackles				Interceptions						Fumbles	
Year	Team	GP	GS	Comb	Total	Ast	Sack	PD	INT	Yds	Avg	Lng	TD	FF	FR
2019	TEN	3	3	13	9	4	2.0	0	0	0	0.0	0	0	0	0
Career		3	3	13	9	4	2.0	0	0	0	0.0	0	0	0	0
