= Maurquice Shakir =

American football player (born 1993)

Los Angeles Chargers
- Title: Coaching intern

Personal information
- Born: October 14, 1993 (age 33); Los Angeles, California, U.S.
- Listed height: 6 ft 4 in (1.93 m)
- Listed weight: 313 lb (142 kg)

Career information
- High school: Los Angeles (CA) Palisades Charter
- College: Middle Tennessee
- NFL draft: 2017: undrafted

Career history

Playing
- Baltimore Ravens (2017); Houston Texans (2018–2019)*; Dallas Renegades (2020)
- * Offseason or practice squad member only

Coaching
- Los Angeles Chargers (2025–present) Coaching intern

Awards and highlights
- Mid Season All-XFL (2020)
- Stats at Pro Football Reference

Maurquice Bryce Shakir (born October 14, 1993) is an American former football guard. He played college football at Middle Tennessee.

== Professional career ==
=== Baltimore Ravens ===
Shakir signed with the Baltimore Ravens as an undrafted free agent on May 5, 2017. He was waived on September 2, 2017 and was signed to the Ravens' practice squad the next day. He was promoted to the active roster on October 31, 2017.

On September 1, 2018, Shakir was waived by the Ravens.

=== Houston Texans ===
On December 12, 2018, Shakir was signed to the Houston Texans practice squad. He signed a reserve/future contract on January 7, 2019. On August 30, 2019, Shakir was released.

=== Dallas Renegades ===
Shakir was drafted in the 3rd round in phase two in the 2020 XFL draft by the Dallas Renegades. He had his contract terminated when the league suspended operations on April 10, 2020.
