= Tyus Bowser =

American football player (born 1995)

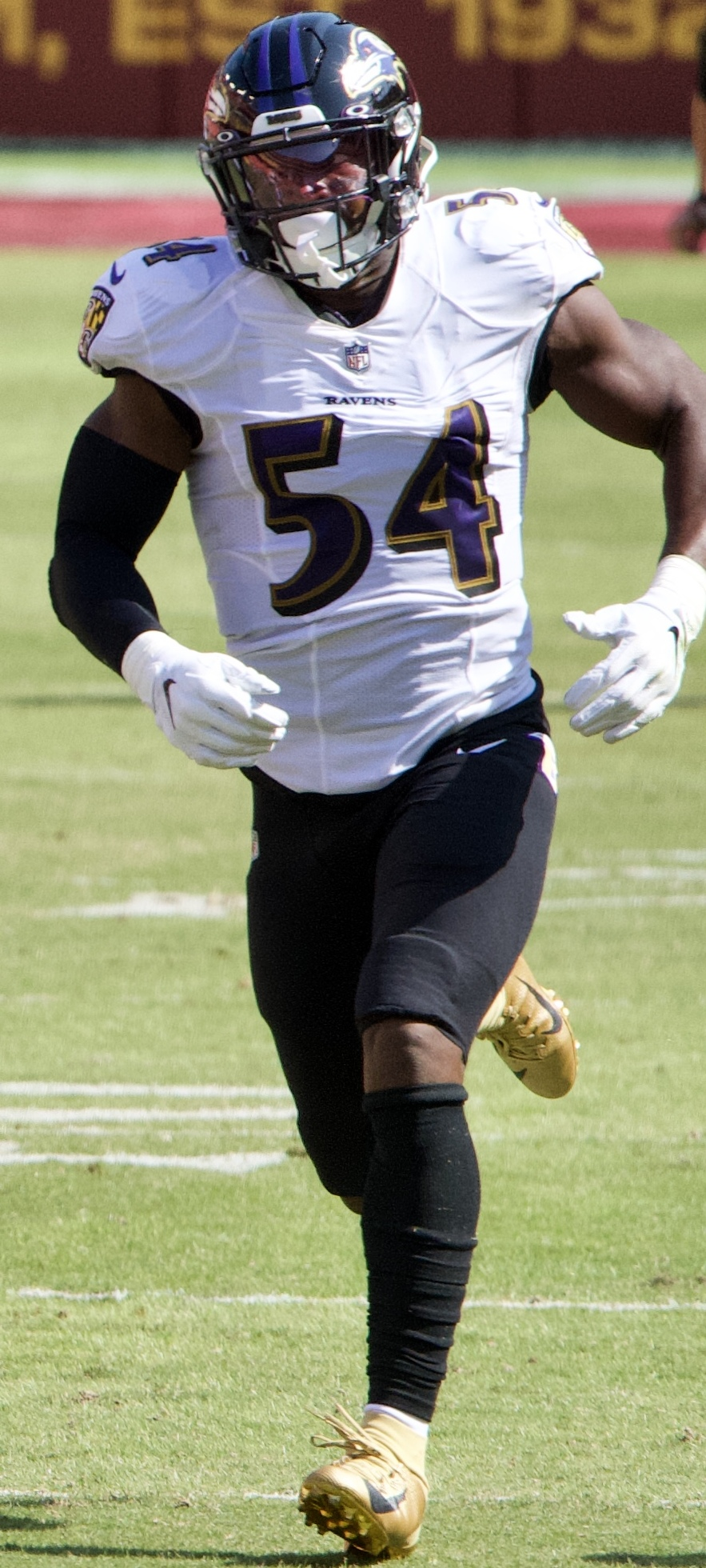
- Bowser with the Baltimore Ravens in 2021

Profile
- Position: Linebacker

Personal information
- Born: May 23, 1995 (age 31); Tyler, Texas, U.S.
- Listed height: 6 ft 3 in (1.91 m)
- Listed weight: 250 lb (113 kg)

Career information
- High school: John Tyler (Tyler, Texas)
- College: Houston (2013–2016)
- NFL draft: 2017: 2nd round, 47th overall pick

Career history
- Baltimore Ravens (2017–2023); Seattle Seahawks (2024); Miami Dolphins (2024)

Awards and highlights
- Second-team All-AAC (2016)

Career NFL statistics
- Total tackles: 163
- Sacks: 19.5
- Forced fumbles: 4
- Fumble recoveries: 1
- Pass deflections: 16
- Interceptions: 4
- Defensive touchdowns: 1
- Stats at Pro Football Reference

Tyus Kevon Bowser (born May 23, 1995) is an American professional football linebacker. He played college football for the Houston Cougars.

== Early life ==
Bowser attended John Tyler High School in Tyler, Texas, where he played for the Lions football team. As a senior, he had 59 tackles and 24 sacks. He committed to the University of Houston to play college football.

== College career ==
Bowser played college football at Houston from 2013 to 2016.

Bowser made his collegiate debut on August 30 against Southern and recorded two tackles. On September 21, he recorded his first two collegiate sacks and had his first interception in a win over Rice. As a freshman in 2013, he had 26 total tackles, 5.0 sacks, one interception, two passes defensed, and one forced fumble. As a sophomore in 2014, he had 13 total tackles and three sacks. As a junior in 2015, he had 51 total tackles, six sacks, one interception, two passes defensed, two fumble recoveries, and one forced fumble.

Bowser missed five games his senior season due to a fractured orbital bone that he suffered during a fight with a teammate. Despite the injury, he led the team with eight sacks. Bowser finished his collegiate career with 137 tackles and 22.5 sacks.

Bowser also played in four games over two seasons for the Houston Cougars basketball team.

== Professional career ==
=== Pre-draft ===
Bowser received an invitation to Senior Bowl. He helped the South defeat the North 16–15. He attended the NFL Combine and completed the majority of drills, but opted to skip the short shuttle and three-cone drill. Bowser also participated at Houston's Pro Day and chose to only run the short shuttle and positional drills. NFL draft experts and analysts projected Bowser to be a first or second round pick. He was ranked the fifth best outside linebacker available in the draft by NFLDraftScout.com, the sixth best linebacker by ESPN, and was ranked the twelfth best edge rusher by Sports Illustrated.

Pre-draft measurables
Height	Weight	Arm length	Hand span	Wingspan	40-yard dash	10-yard split	20-yard split	20-yard shuttle	Three-cone drill	Vertical jump	Broad jump	Bench press
6 ft 2 5/8 in (1.90 m)	247 lb (112 kg)	33 1/4 in (0.84 m)	10 1/8 in (0.26 m)	6 ft 7 1/8 in (2.01 m)	4.65 s	1.59 s	2.68 s	4.34 s	6.75 s	37.5 in (0.95 m)	10 ft 7 in (3.23 m)	21 reps
All values from NFL Combine/Houston's Pro Day

=== Baltimore Ravens ===
==== 2017 season ====
The Baltimore Ravens selected Bowser in the second round with the 47th overall pick in the 2017 NFL draft. He was the third outside linebacker to be selected. On May 5, 2017, the Ravens signed Bowser to a four-year, $5.57 million contract with $3.37 million guaranteed and a signing bonus of $2.19 million.

Bowser made his NFL debut in the 2017 season opener against the Cincinnati Bengals. He recorded one tackle in the 20–0 victory over the Bengals. He recorded his first NFL interception in Week 2 against quarterback Kevin Hogan of the Cleveland Browns, returning it for 27 yards and setting up a critical touchdown by the Ravens' offense before halftime. Overall, in his rookie season, he finished with three sacks, nine tackles, one interception, and three passes defensed.

==== 2018 season ====
Bowser finished the 2018 season with .5 sacks and 11 total tackles in 15 games.

==== 2019 season ====
In Week 10 of the 2019 season, Bowser recorded a 33-yard fumble return for a touchdown in the 49–13 victory over the Bengals. He followed that up with a two-sack performance in a 41–7 victory over the Houston Texans in the next game. He finished the 2019 season with five sacks, 24 total tackles, two passes defended, and one forced fumble.

==== 2020 season ====
Bowser was placed on the reserve/COVID-19 list by the team on November 3, 2020, and activated four days later. In the 2020 season, Bowser finished with two sacks, 34 total tackles, three interceptions, and five passes defended.

==== 2021 season ====
On March 16, 2021, Bowser re-signed with the Ravens, on a four-year, $22 million deal, with the potential to rise to $27 million. In the final seconds in the fourth quarter Bowser sacked Andy Dalton for a loss of 18 yards, which yielded a 16–13 win over the Chicago Bears on November 21, 2021. The following week, against the Browns, Bowser recorded a sack on Baker Mayfield, as well as a game sealing tackle on fourth down in the 16–10 victory. Bowser finished the 2021 season with seven sacks, 59 total tackles, four passes defended, and two forced fumbles.

On January 14, 2022, Bowser underwent surgery to repair a torn Achilles.

==== 2022 season ====
On August 26, 2022, Bowser was placed on the reserve/PUP list to start the season. He was activated on November 1. He appeared in nine games in the 2022 season. He finished with two sacks, 13 total tackles, two passes defended, and one forced fumble.

==== 2023 season ====
Bowser was placed on the reserve/non-football injury list to start the season due to a knee injury over the summer that had setback before the season.

On March 13, 2024, Bowser was released by the Ravens.

=== Seattle Seahawks ===
On August 30, 2024, the Seattle Seahawks signed Bowser to their practice squad.

=== Miami Dolphins ===
On October 3, 2024, Bowser was signed by the Miami Dolphins off the Seahawks practice squad. He appeared in nine games and started five in the 2024 season.

== NFL career statistics ==
=== Regular season ===
Year	Team	Games		Tackling					Fumbles				Interceptions					
Year	Team	GP	GS	Cmb	Solo	Ast	Sck	TFL	FF	FR	Yds	TD	Int	Yds	Avg	Lng	TD	PD
2017	BAL	16	0	11	9	2	3.0	3	0	0	0	0	1	27	27.0	27	0	3
2018	BAL	15	0	11	6	5	0.5	1	0	0	0	0	0	0	0	0	0	0
2019	BAL	16	0	24	20	4	5.0	3	1	1	33	1	0	0	0	0	0	2
2020	BAL	16	2	34	17	17	2.0	4	0	0	0	0	3	53	17.7	25	0	5
2021	BAL	17	17	59	33	26	7.0	8	2	0	0	0	0	0	0	0	0	4
2022	BAL	9	4	13	8	5	2.0	3	1	0	0	0	0	0	0	0	0	2
2023	BAL	0	0	Did not play due to injury														
2024	SEA	2	1	1	1	0	0.0	0	0	0	0.0	0	0	0	0	0	0	0
2024	MIA	7	4	10	5	5	0.0	0	0	0	0.0	0	0	0	0	0	0	0
Career		98	28	163	99	64	19.5	22	4	1	33	1	4	80	20.0	27	0	16

=== Postseason ===
Year	Team	Games		Tackling					Fumbles				Interceptions					
Year	Team	GP	GS	Cmb	Solo	Ast	Sck	TFL	FF	FR	Yds	TD	Int	Yds	Avg	Lng	TD	PD
2018	BAL	1	0	0	0	0	0.0	0	0	0	0	0	0	0	0	0	0	0
2019	BAL	1	0	0	0	0	0.0	0	0	0	0	0	0	0	0	0	0	1
2020	BAL	2	0	4	3	1	0.0	1	0	0	0	0	0	0	0	0	0	1
2022	BAL	1	0	3	2	1	1.0	1	0	0	0	0	0	0	0	0	0	0
2023	BAL	0	0	Did not play due to injury														
Career		4	0	7	5	2	1.0	2	0	0	0	0	0	0	0	0	0	2
