= Albert McClellan =

American football player (born 1986)

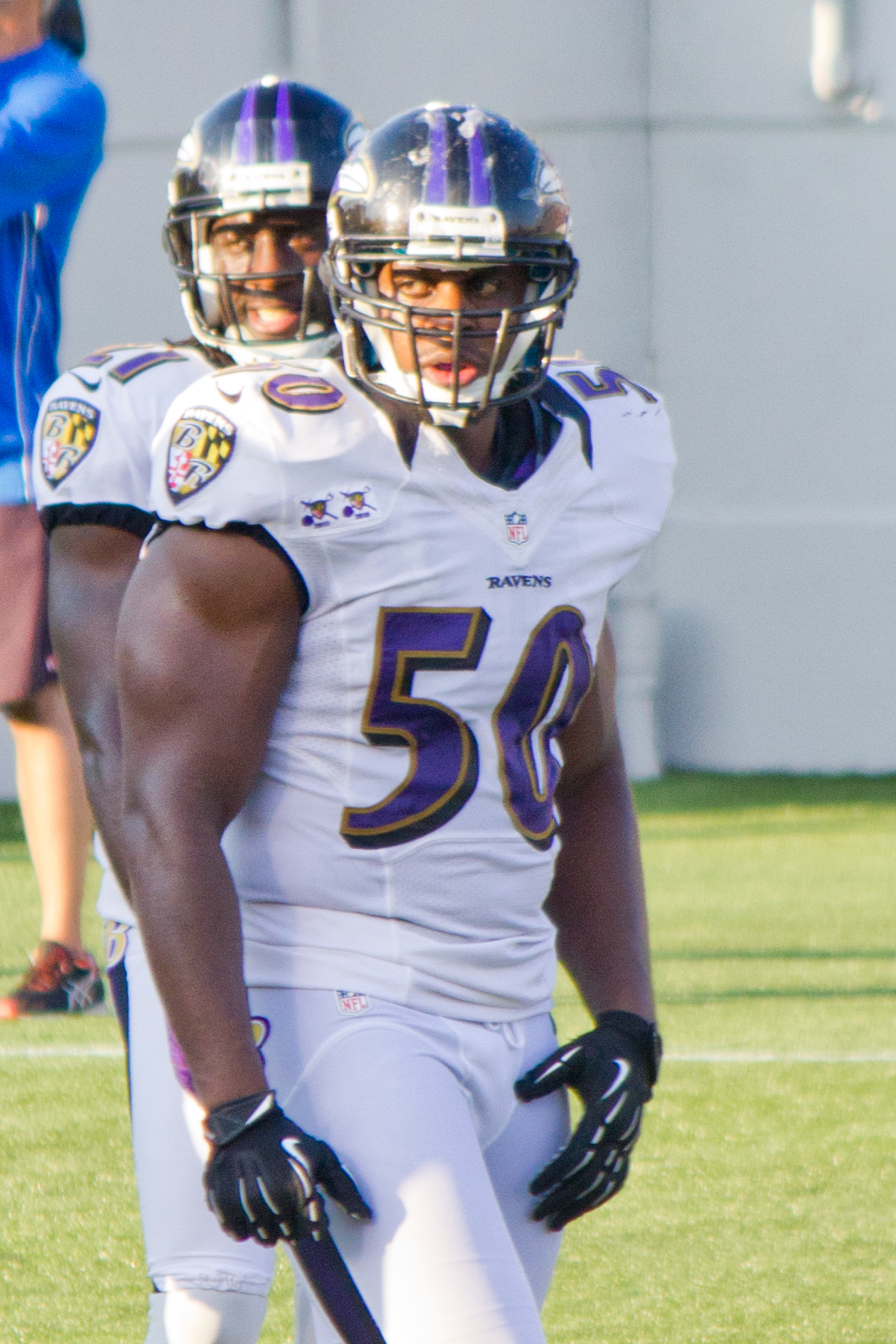
- McClellan during Baltimore Ravens practice at Navy–Marine Corps Memorial Stadium in 2012

No. 50, 59, 47
- Position: Linebacker

Personal information
- Born: June 4, 1986 (age 40); Lakeland, Florida, U.S.
- Listed height: 6 ft 2 in (1.88 m)
- Listed weight: 235 lb (107 kg)

Career information
- High school: Kathleen (Lakeland)
- College: Marshall (2005–2009)
- NFL draft: 2010: undrafted

Career history
- Baltimore Ravens (2010–2018); New England Patriots (2018); New York Jets (2019)

Awards and highlights
- 2× Super Bowl champion (XLVII, LIII); All-Pro (2018); C-USA Defensive Player of the Year (2006); 2× First-team All-Conference USA (2006, 2008); Second-team All-Conference USA (2009)

Career NFL statistics
- Total tackles: 182
- Sacks: 3.0
- Forced fumbles: 4
- Fumble recoveries: 5
- Stats at Pro Football Reference

Albert Jamal McClellan (born June 4, 1986) is an American former professional football player who was a linebacker in the National Football League (NFL). He played college football for the Marshall Thundering Herd from 2005 to 2009, and was signed by the Baltimore Ravens as an undrafted free agent after the 2010 NFL draft.

== Early life ==
A native of Lakeland, Florida, McClellan attended Kathleen High School, where he was rated as a two-star recruit by Rivals.com.

== College career ==
McClellan played college football for Marshall. While there he was a three-time All-Conference USA selection, as well as the C-USA Defensive Player of the Year in 2006. He redshirted in 2007 after suffering a torn anterior cruciate ligament in pre-season, an injury that sidelined him for the year.

== Professional career ==
Pre-draft measurables
Height	Weight	Arm length	Hand span	40-yard dash	10-yard split	20-yard split	20-yard shuttle	Three-cone drill	Vertical jump	Broad jump	Bench press
6 ft 1 in (1.85 m)	247 lb (112 kg)	33 in (0.84 m)	9 3/4	4.75 s	1.65 s	2.73 s	4.21 s	7.24 s	36 1/2	9 ft 11 in (3.02 m)	26 reps
All values from NFL Combine

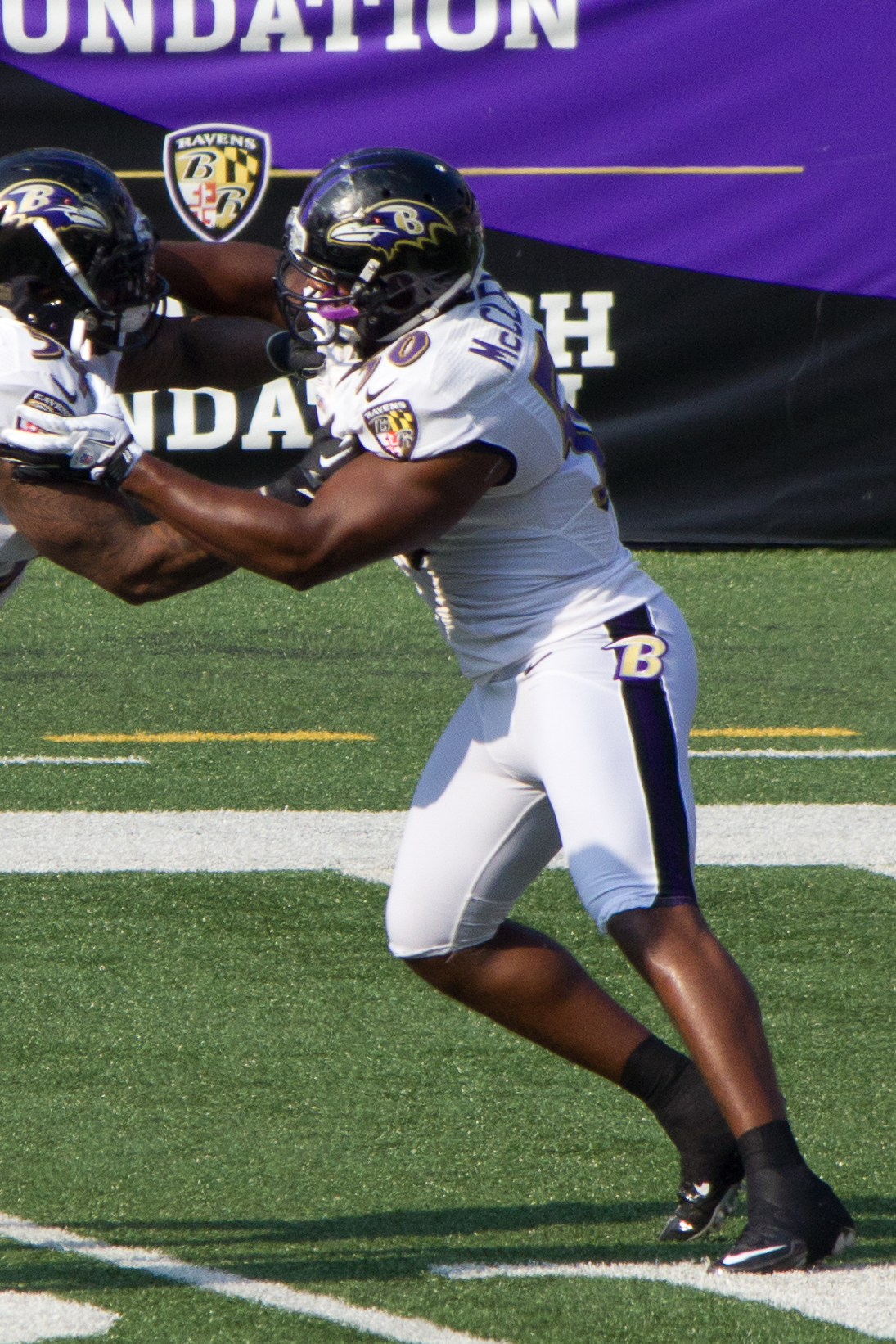
McClellan at M&T Bank Stadium in 2012.

=== Baltimore Ravens ===
McClellan was signed by the Baltimore Ravens as an undrafted free agent after the 2010 NFL draft. McClellan played as the fourth string middle linebacker (Behind Ray Lewis, Jameel McClain, and Dannell Ellerbe). He did not play at all in the 2010 season, but saw limited time the next year. With an injury to Terrell Suggs and the departure of Jarret Johnson to free agency in 2012, McClellan had a chance to compete for a starting outside linebacker spot with Paul Kruger, Courtney Upshaw, and Sergio Kindle. Upshaw appeared to have the edge for most of training camp, but in the third preseason game, McClellan got the start. He would start 11 games during the season, and would record 49 tackles and a sack, both career highs. The Ravens did go on to win Super Bowl XLVII after they beat the San Francisco 49ers 34–31.

On March 9, 2014, McClellan signed a new two-year contract to remain with the Ravens.

McClellan signed a three-year extension to remain with Baltimore on March 1, 2016.

In 2017 during training camp, McClellan tore his ACL and was ruled out for the season. He was placed on injured reserve on September 1, 2017.

On September 1, 2018, McClellan was released by the Ravens. He was re-signed on September 17, 2018. He was released again on October 30, 2018.

=== New England Patriots ===
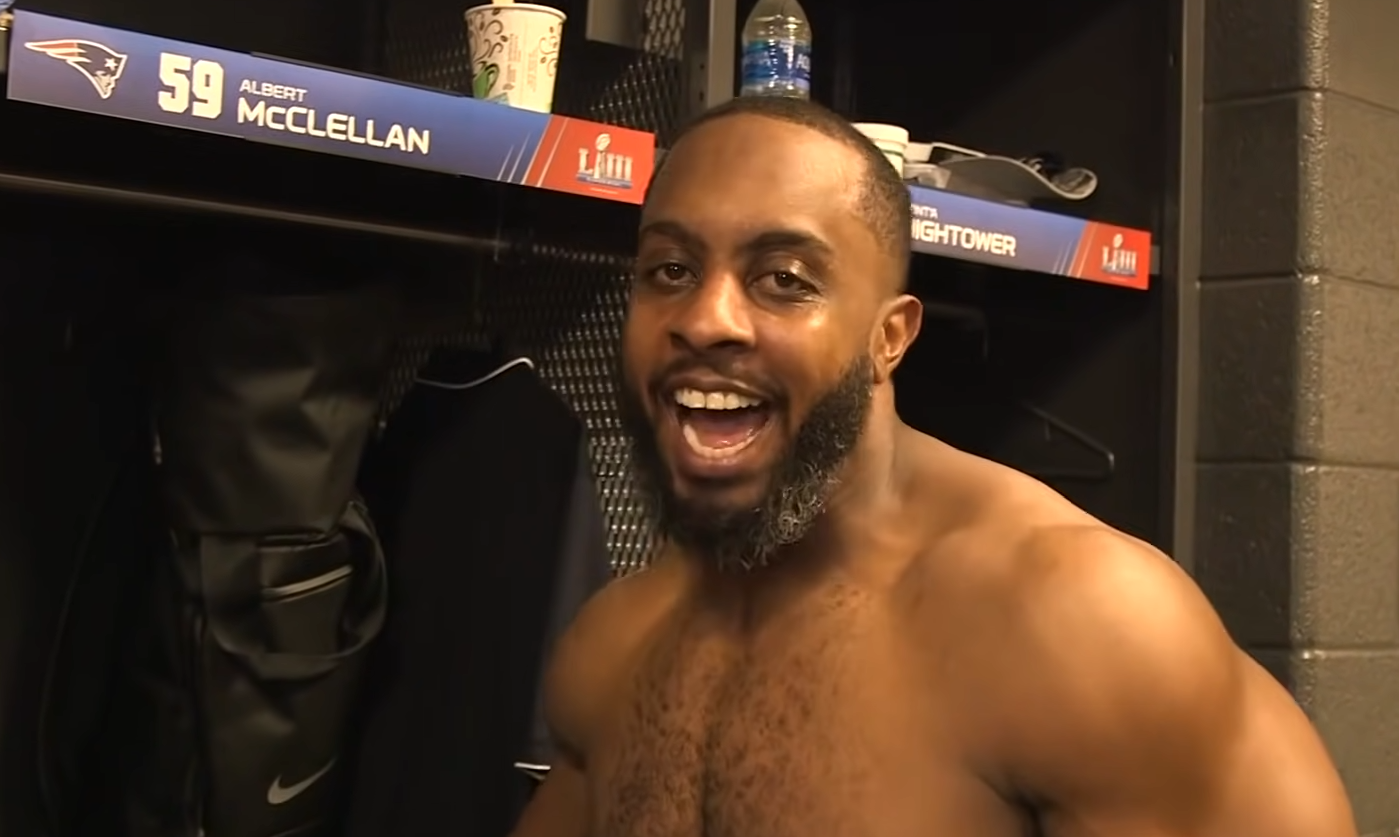
McClellan after winning Super Bowl LIII

On November 6, 2018, McClellan was signed by the New England Patriots. In Week 14, McClellan blocked two punts on Dolphins punter Matt Haack. In the divisional round of the playoffs against the Los Angeles Chargers, McClellan recovered a fumble off a muffed punt. The Patriots went on to win Super Bowl LIII 13–3 against the Los Angeles Rams to give McClellan his second Super Bowl title.

=== New York Jets ===
On August 17, 2019, McClellan was signed by the New York Jets. He was released on September 1, 2019, but was re-signed the next day. He was placed on injured reserve on October 30, 2019, with a concussion.
