= 2021 Baltimore Ravens season =

26th season in franchise history, winless collapse after 8–3 start

- Owner: Steve Bisciotti
- General manager: Eric DeCosta
- Head coach: John Harbaugh
- Offensive coordinator: Greg Roman
- Defensive coordinator: Don Martindale
- Home stadium: M&T Bank Stadium

Results
- Record: 8–9
- Division place: 4th AFC North
- Playoffs: Did not qualify
- All-Pros: 3: TE Mark Andrews (1st team); K Justin Tucker (1st team); PR Devin Duvernay (1st team)
- Pro Bowlers: 5: QB Lamar Jackson; FB Patrick Ricard; TE Mark Andrews; K Justin Tucker; RS Devin Duvernay
- Team MVP: Mark Andrews

Uniform
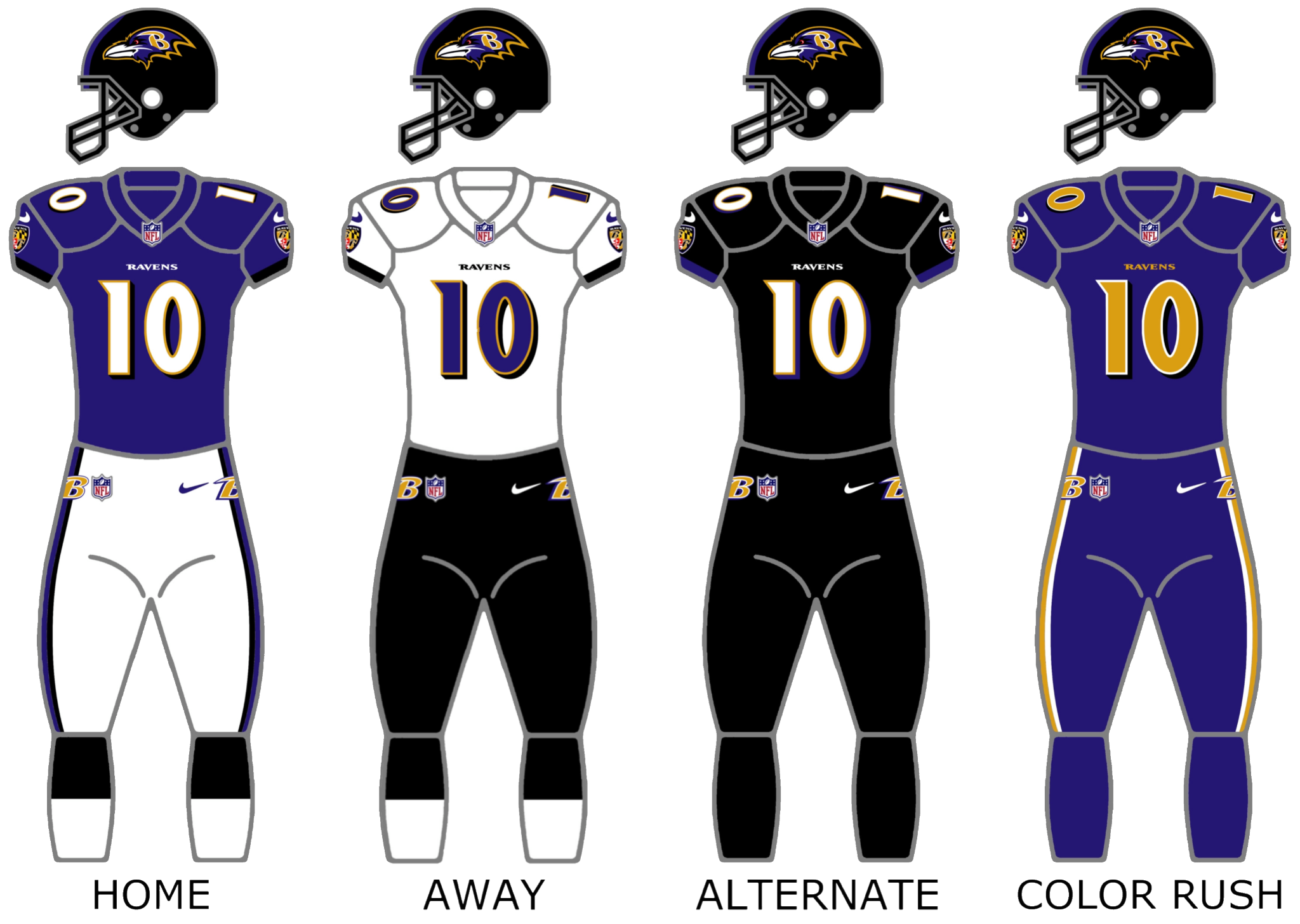

The 2021 season was the Baltimore Ravens' 26th season in the National Football League (NFL) and their 14th under head coach John Harbaugh.

Several NFL records were broken or achieved by the Ravens this season. On August 23, the Baltimore Ravens and John Harbaugh claimed the record of consecutive preseason wins with 20, overtaking Vince Lombardi’s Green Bay Packers record with a win over the Washington Football Team. On September 26, placekicker Justin Tucker broke the NFL record for the longest field goal in history, kicking a 66-yard field goal as time expired to beat the Detroit Lions 19–17. The next week, on October 3, the Ravens tied the record for most consecutive games rushing over 100 yards as a team with 43 (tied with their division rival Steelers) in a 23–7 win over the Denver Broncos.

However, despite starting the season 8–3 as well as leading the AFC North, the Ravens suffered a late-season collapse, ending the season with a brutal six game losing streak in which five of the losses were by a combined 8 points, including two of the five losses as a result of a failed two-point conversion late in the fourth quarter, and failed to improve on their 11–5 record from last season after a Week 15 loss to the Green Bay Packers. The Ravens also suffered their first losing season since 2015, finished last place in the AFC North for the first time since 2007, and failed to qualify for the postseason for the first time since 2017 after a loss to the Steelers in Week 18. It was the first time in the Lamar Jackson era that the Ravens failed to qualify for the postseason. This season also marks the most recent season the Ravens finished in last place in the AFC North.

The Ravens suffered many injuries to key players throughout the season, including losing J. K. Dobbins, Gus Edwards, Justice Hill, L. J. Fort, and Marcus Peters to season-ending injuries before the regular season started, and losing Ronnie Stanley, Marlon Humphrey, Derek Wolfe, DeShon Elliott and more during the season, while quarterback Lamar Jackson missed the final four games of the season due to an ankle injury. The Ravens ended the season with a league high 19 players on injured reserve. The year was also only the second in Ravens history to not have a Pro Bowler on defense, with the other being 2005.

== Offseason ==
=== Players added ===
Position	Player	Tag	2020 Team	Date
G	Kevin Zeitler	UFA (Cut)	New York Giants	March 15
TE	Josh Oliver	Traded	Jacksonville Jaguars	March 17
FS	Geno Stone	UFA	Houston Texans	March 23
WR	Sammy Watkins	UFA	Kansas City Chiefs	March 26
OT	Alejandro Villanueva	UFA	Pittsburgh Steelers	May 4
OT	Ja'Wuan James	UFA (Cut)	Denver Broncos	June 7
DE	Chris Smith	UFA	Las Vegas Raiders	July 27
DE	Justin Houston	UFA	Indianapolis Colts	July 31
RB	Le'Veon Bell	UFA	Kansas City Chiefs	September 7
RB	Devonta Freeman	UFA	New York Giants	September 9
RB	Latavius Murray	UFA (Cut)	New Orleans Saints	September 10

=== Players lost ===
Position	Player	Tag	2021 Team	Date
QB	Robert Griffin III	Waived		January 18
WR	De'Anthony Thomas	Waived		January 18
CB	Tramon Williams	Waived	Retired	January 18
RB	Mark Ingram II	Waived	Houston Texans	January 19
OLB	Matthew Judon	UFA	New England Patriots	March 15
EDGE	Yannick Ngakoue	UFA	Las Vegas Raiders	March 15
WR	Chris Moore	UFA	Houston Texans	March 15
DE	Jihad Ward	UFA	Jacksonville Jaguars	March 16
LS	Morgan Cox	UFA	Tennessee Titans	March 17
C	Matt Skura	UFA	New York Giants	March 18
S	Jayron Kearse	UFA	Dallas Cowboys	March 24
WR	Willie Snead	UFA	Las Vegas Raiders	March 26
OT	Orlando Brown Jr.	Traded	Kansas City Chiefs	April 23
OLB	Chauncey Rivers	Waived	Green Bay Packers	August 4
TE	Jake Breeland	Waived/Injured		August 9
CB	Davontae Harris	Waived	San Francisco 49ers	August 15
TE	Eli Wolf	Waived		August 15
CB	Shaun Wade	Traded	New England Patriots	August 26
C	Greg Mancz	Traded	Miami Dolphins	August 28
OG	Ben Bredeson	Traded	New York Giants	August 31
SS	Nigel Warrior	Waived	Seattle Seahawks	August 31

== 2021 NFL draft ==
2021 Baltimore Ravens draft
Round	Selection	Player	Position	College
1	27	Rashod Bateman	WR	Minnesota
1	31	Odafe Oweh	OLB	Penn State
3	94	Ben Cleveland	OG	Georgia
3	104	Brandon Stephens	CB	SMU
4	131	Tylan Wallace	WR	Oklahoma State
5	160	Shaun Wade	CB	Ohio State
5	171	Daelin Hayes	OLB	Notre Dame
5	184	Ben Mason	FB	Michigan

Notes

- Baltimore traded offensive tackle Orlando Brown Jr., their 2021 second-round selection (No. 58) and a 2022 sixth-round selection to Kansas City for their 2021 first-round selection (No. 31), 2021 third-round selection (No. 94), 2021 fourth-round selection (No. 136), and a 2022 fifth-round selection.
- Baltimore traded its third-round selection (No. 91) and a conditional 2022 fifth-round pick that would have converted to as high as a third-round pick to Minnesota in exchange for linebacker Yannick Ngakoue.
- Baltimore received compensatory third-round selections in 2021 (No. 104) and 2022 when its assistant head coach and passing game coordinator David Culley was hired by Houston as head coach.
- Baltimore traded the fourth-round selection it had earlier acquired from the Kansas City Chiefs (No. 136) and its own sixth-round selection (No. 210) to Arizona for their 5th round selection (No. 160) and a 2022 fourth-round pick.
- Baltimore received a compensatory fifth-round selection (No. 184) in 2021 due to the loss of DT Michael Pierce in free agency the previous offseason.

=== Undrafted free agent signings ===
2021 Baltimore Ravens Undrafted Free Agent Signings
Player	Position	College
Ar'Darius Washington	S	TCU
Adrian Ealy	OT	Oklahoma
Tony Poljan	TE	Virginia
Sam Cooper	OG	Merrimack
Foster Sarell	OT	Stanford
Xavier Kelly	DT	Arkansas
Blake Gallagher	LB	Northwestern
Nate McCrary	RB	Saginaw Valley State
Donte Sylencieux	WR	Graceland
Barrington Wade	LB	Iowa
Kenji Bahar	QB	Monmouth
Jake Verity	K	East Carolina
Jovan Swann	DL	Indiana

== Staff ==
2021 Baltimore Ravens staff
Front office: Owner – Steve Bisciotti; President – Dick Cass; Executive vice president/general manager – Eric DeCosta; Executive vice president/player personnel – Ozzie Newsome; Senior vice president of football administration – Pat Moriarty; Director of pro personnel – Vince Newsome; Director of college scouting – Joe Hortiz; Director of football administration – Nick Matteo; Director of compliance – Jessica Markison; Senior personnel assistant – George Kokinis; Director of football information – Megan McLaughlin; Director of football research – Scott Cohen; Head coaches: Head coach – John Harbaugh; Assistant to the Head Coach – Dan Parsons; Offensive coaches: Offensive coordinator – Greg Roman; Quarterbacks – James Urban; Running backs – Craig Ver Steeg; Wide receivers – Tee Martin; Tight ends – Bobby Engram; Offensive line – Joe D'Alessandris; Assistant offensive line – Richard Angulo; Pass game specialist – Keith Williams	Defensive coaches: Defensive coordinator – Don Martindale; Defensive line/run game coordinator – Anthony Weaver; Assistant defensive line – Jason Brooks; Inside Linebackers – Rob Ryan; Assistant linebackers – Jay Peterson; Outside linebackers – Drew Wilkins; Defensive backs – D'Anton Lynn; Passing defense coordinator – Chris Hewitt; Special teams coaches: Special teams coordinator – Chris Horton; Assistant special teams – T. J. Weist; Special teams – Randy Brown; Strength and conditioning: Head strength and conditioning – Steve Saunders; Assistant strength and conditioning – Anthony Watson; Coaching analyst - performance – Scott Elliott; Coaching analyst - performance – Sam Rosengarten; Coaching analyst - performance – Ron Shrift

== Final roster ==
2021 Baltimore Ravens roster
Quarterbacks (QB): 2 Tyler Huntley; 8 Lamar Jackson; 15 Josh Johnson; Running backs (RB): 33 Devonta Freeman; 28 Latavius Murray; 34 Ty'Son Williams; Wide receivers (WR): 12 Rashod Bateman; 80 Miles Boykin; 5 Marquise Brown; 13 Devin Duvernay; 11 James Proche; 16 Tylan Wallace; 14 Sammy Watkins; Tight ends (TE): 89 Mark Andrews; 84 Josh Oliver; 85 Eric Tomlinson	Offensive linemen (OL): 77 Bradley Bozeman C; 66 Ben Cleveland G; 63 Trystan Colon C/G; 65 Patrick Mekari T; 72 Ben Powers G; 62 David Sharpe T; 78 Alejandro Villanueva T; 70 Kevin Zeitler G; Defensive linemen (DL): 93 Calais Campbell DE; 71 Justin Ellis NT; 92 Justin Madubuike DE; 96 Broderick Washington DE; 98 Brandon Williams NT	Linebackers (LB): 49 Chris Board ILB; 54 Tyus Bowser OLB; 56 Josh Bynes ILB; 45 Jaylon Ferguson OLB; 40 Malik Harrison ILB; 50 Justin Houston OLB; 90 Pernell McPhee OLB; 99 Odafe Oweh OLB; 6 Patrick Queen ILB; 57 Kristian Welch ILB; Defensive backs (DB): 23 Anthony Averett CB; 36 Chuck Clark SS; 31 Tony Jefferson SS; 41 Anthony Levine SS; 38 Kevon Seymour CB; 22 Jimmy Smith CB; 21 Brandon Stephens FS; 26 Geno Stone FS; 30 Chris Westry CB; 25 Tavon Young CB; Special teams (ST): 4 Sam Koch P; 46 Nick Moore LS; 9 Justin Tucker K	Practice squad: 17 Robert Jackson CB; 61 Jaryd Jones-Smith T; 94 Isaiah Mack DE; 47 Nate McCrary RB (PS/I); 69 Kahlil McKenzie NT; 10 Jaylon Moore WR; 67 Jimmy Murray C; 37 Jacques Patrick RB; 83 Tony Poljan TE; 53 Adam Redmond C; 48 Jordan Richards FS; 7 Chris Streveler QB; 58 Joe Thomas ILB; 18 Kevin Toliver CB; 15 Jake Verity K (PS/I); 81 Binjimen Victor WR; 39 Mazzi Wilkins CB (COVID-19); 29 Daryl Worley CB; Reserve: 51 Otaro Alaka ILB (IR); 86 Nick Boyle TE (COVID-19); 97 Aaron Crawford DE (IR); 27 J. K. Dobbins RB (IR); -- Khalil Dorsey CB (IR); 35 Gus Edwards RB (IR); 32 DeShon Elliott FS (IR); 3 L. J. Fort ILB (IR); 59 Daelin Hayes OLB (IR); 43 Justice Hill RB (IR); 44 Marlon Humphrey CB (IR); 76 Ja'Wuan James T (NF-Inj.); 91 Xavier Kelly NT (IR); -- Brandon Knight T (DNR); 37 Iman Marshall CB (IR); 24 Marcus Peters CB (IR); 74 Tyre Phillips T/G (IR); 42 Patrick Ricard FB (IR); 79 Ronnie Stanley T (IR); -- Ar'Darius Washington FS (IR); 95 Derek Wolfe DE (IR); Rookies in italics 52 active, 21 reserve, 15 practice squad (3 exempt)

== Preseason ==
The Ravens' preseason opponents and schedule were announced in the spring.

Week	Date	Opponent	Result	Record	Venue	Recap
1	August 14	New Orleans Saints	W 17–14	1–0	M&T Bank Stadium	Recap
2	August 21	at Carolina Panthers	W 20–3	2–0	Bank of America Stadium	Recap
3	August 28	at Washington Football Team	W 37–3	3–0	FedExField	Recap

Note

- The Ravens' three preseason victories extended their preseason winning streak to 20 games (an NFL record).

== Regular season ==
=== Schedule ===
The Ravens' 2021 schedule was announced on May 12. Apart from their AFC North division games, the Ravens played games against the AFC West and NFC North in accordance with the NFL's schedule rotation. They also played against the Indianapolis Colts, the Miami Dolphins, and the Los Angeles Rams, who finished 2020 in the same position as the Ravens in the two other AFC divisions and the NFC West, which the Ravens would play fully in 2019 and 2023.

Week	Date	Opponent	Result	Record	Venue	Recap
1	September 13	at Las Vegas Raiders	**L** 27–33 (OT)	0–1	Allegiant Stadium	Recap
2	September 19	Kansas City Chiefs	**W** 36–35	1–1	M&T Bank Stadium	Recap
3	September 26	at Detroit Lions	**W** 19–17	2–1	Ford Field	Recap
4	October 3	at Denver Broncos	**W** 23–7	3–1	Empower Field at Mile High	Recap
5	October 11	Indianapolis Colts	**W** 31–25 (OT)	4–1	M&T Bank Stadium	Recap
6	October 17	Los Angeles Chargers	**W** 34–6	5–1	M&T Bank Stadium	Recap
7	October 24	**Cincinnati Bengals**	**L** 17–41	5–2	M&T Bank Stadium	Recap
8	Bye					
9	November 7	Minnesota Vikings	**W** 34–31 (OT)	6–2	M&T Bank Stadium	Recap
10	November 11	at Miami Dolphins	**L** 10–22	6–3	Hard Rock Stadium	Recap
11	November 21	at Chicago Bears	**W** 16–13	7–3	Soldier Field	Recap
12	November 28	**Cleveland Browns**	**W** 16–10	8–3	M&T Bank Stadium	Recap
13	December 5	at **Pittsburgh Steelers**	**L** 19–20	8–4	Heinz Field	Recap
14	December 12	at **Cleveland Browns**	**L** 22–24	8–5	FirstEnergy Stadium	Recap
15	December 19	Green Bay Packers	**L** 30–31	8–6	M&T Bank Stadium	Recap
16	December 26	at **Cincinnati Bengals**	**L** 21–41	8–7	Paul Brown Stadium	Recap
17	January 2	Los Angeles Rams	**L** 19–20	8–8	M&T Bank Stadium	Recap
18	January 9	**Pittsburgh Steelers**	**L** 13–16 (OT)	8–9	M&T Bank Stadium	Recap

Note: Intra-division opponents are in bold text.

=== Game summaries ===
==== Week 1: Las Vegas Raiders 33, Baltimore Ravens 27 (OT) ====
Week 1: Baltimore Ravens at Las Vegas Raiders – Game summary

Quarter	1	2	3	4	OT	Total
Ravens	7	7	3	10	0	**27**
**Raiders**	0	10	0	17	6	**33**

at Allegiant Stadium, Paradise, Nevada

- Date: September 13
- Game time: 8:15 p.m. EDT/5:15 p.m. PDT
- Game weather: None (indoor stadium)
- Game attendance: 61,756
- Referee: Shawn Smith
- TV announcers (ESPN/ABC): Steve Levy, Brian Griese, Louis Riddick, and Lisa Salters
- Recap, Game Book

Game information

**First quarter**

- BAL – Ty'Son Williams 35-yard run (Justin Tucker kick), 1:47. Ravens 7–0. **Drive: 6 plays, 65 yards, 2:59.**

**Second quarter**

- BAL – Marquise Brown 10-yard pass from Lamar Jackson (Justin Tucker kick), 8:52. Ravens 14–0. **Drive: 6 plays, 68 yards, 2:38.**
- LV – Josh Jacobs 2-yard run (Daniel Carlson kick), 4:14. Ravens 14–7. **Drive: 9 plays, 75 yards, 4:38.**
- LV – Daniel Carlson 34-yard field goal, 0:00. Ravens 14–10. **Drive: 9 plays, 48 yards, 1:12.**

**Third quarter**

- BAL – Justin Tucker 40-yard field goal, 8:24. Ravens 17–10. **Drive: 6 plays, 16 yards, 2:24.**

**Fourth quarter**

- LV – Josh Jacobs 15-yard run (Daniel Carlson kick), 9:18. Tied 17–17. **Drive: 5 plays, 41 yards, 2:36.**
- BAL – Latavius Murray 8-yard run (Justin Tucker kick), 6:04. Ravens 24–17. **Drive: 6 plays, 75 yards, 3:14.**
- LV – Darren Waller 10-yard pass from Derek Carr (Daniel Carlson kick), 3:44. Tied 24–24. **Drive: 9 plays, 75 yards, 2:20.**
- BAL – Justin Tucker 47-yard field goal, 0:37. Ravens 27–24. **Drive: 8 plays, 46 yards, 3:07.**
- LV – Daniel Carlson 55-yard field goal, 0:02. Tied 27–27. **Drive: 5 plays, 38 yards, 0:35.**

**Overtime**

- LV – Zay Jones 31-yard pass from Derek Carr, 3:38. Raiders 33–27. **Drive: 2 plays, 27 yards, 0:53.**

**Top passers**

- BAL – Lamar Jackson – 19/30, 235 yards, TD
- LV – Derek Carr – 34/56, 435 yards, 2 TD, INT

**Top rushers**

- BAL – Lamar Jackson – 12 rushes, 86 yards
- LV – Josh Jacobs – 10 rushes, 34 yards, 2 TD

**Top receivers**

- BAL – Sammy Watkins – 4 receptions, 96 yards
- LV – Darren Waller – 10 receptions, 105 yards, TD

The Ravens blew multiple fourth quarter leads and lost in overtime 27–33 to the Raiders on Monday Night Football.

The Raiders received the opening kickoff and moved into Baltimore territory before a shotgun snap that was not expected by Las Vegas quarterback Derek Carr led to a 15-yard loss. As a result of the play, the Raiders were forced to punt. The Ravens were unable to do much with the ball and punted as well. A three-and-out series by the Raiders gave the ball to the Ravens at their own 35. The Ravens moved into Raider territory, but were faced with a fourth and one at the Raider 35-yard line. Ty'Son Williams broke through the line on the fourth down play for a 35-yard touchdown run to give Baltimore a 7–0 lead. The teams exchanged punts on their next possessions before the Ravens moved into Raider territory again. Lamar Jackson hit Marquise Brown on a 10-yard touchdown pass with nine minutes remaining in the second quarter and it appeared the Raiders might get blown out. However, on the ensuing possession, Carr was finally able to connect with tight end Darren Waller and move the ball to the Ravens two-yard line before Josh Jacobs scored to cut the lead in half, 14–7. The Ravens again moved into Raider territory with less than two minutes left in the half, but were stopped short on fourth down and turned the ball over to Las Vegas. Carr quickly moved the Raiders to the Baltimore 14-yard line, but had to settle for a Daniel Carlson 34-yard field goal as the half ended leaving the score 14–10 at halftime.

In the second half, the team exchanged punts again before the Ravens connected on a 40-yard field goal by Justin Tucker to move the lead back to seven at 17–10. The Raiders looked to answer by moving in to Raven territory, but were stuffed on a fourth-and-one at the Raven 13. The teams again exchanged punts as the game moved to the fourth quarter. The Ravens took over with 13:23 remaining in the quarter, but Jackson scrambled and had the ball knocked out of his hands and fumbled with the Raiders' Denzel Perryman recovering the ball at the Baltimore 41. Four plays later, Jacobs scored on a 25-yard run to tie the game at 17. The Ravens quickly answered as Latavius Murray scored on an eight-yard touchdown run to give the Ravens a 24–17 lead with about six minutes remaining. Carr moved the Raiders down field and, with just under four minutes left, hit Waller for a 10-yard touchdown pass to again tie the game. Baltimore responded by moving into Raider territory, but were unable to get a first down on a third-down play at the Vegas 31 and were forced to settle for a field goal with 37 seconds remaining. Carr, with no timeouts, hit Bryan Edwards for a 20-yard gain on the first play of the ensuing possession. After a spike to stop the clock, Carr hit Edwards again for 18 yards to move the ball to the Raven 37. Carlson then hit a 55-yard field to tie the game at 27. With two second remaining in the quarter, the Ravens took a knee to settle for overtime.

In overtime, the Raiders won the toss and moved into Raven territory on a pass by Carr to Hunter Renfrow. Renfrow appeared to step out of bounds at least once on the 27-yard play, but no review was made. Two plays later, Carr, backpedaling to avoid the rush, threw a 33-yard touchdown pass to Edwards to apparently win the game. As players celebrated on the field, the play was reviewed and it was determined Edwards was down near the one-yard line, overturning the touchdown. After clearing the field, Carr was stuffed on sneak attempt. Rookie right tackle Alex Leatherwood then committed a false start penalty and the ball was moved back outside the five-yard line. Following an incompletion, Carr's next pass went through the hands of Willie Snead and bounced off a DeShon Elliott's helmet before being intercepted by Anthony Averett in the end zone for a touchback. After the Ravens took over at the 20, Jackson fumbled again which was again recovered by the Raiders. Following a one-yard run to the Ravens' 26, the Raiders belatedly decided to attempt a field goal. However, due to the slow decision, Carlson did not get on the field in time and the Raiders, who had used their two timeouts on the prior possession, committed a delay of game penalty. Jon Gruden decided to not try the field goal on the next play and Carr, under pressure and backpedaling, threw to a wide open Zay Jones for a 31-yard touchdown to end the game.

With the heartbreaking upset loss, the Ravens fell to 0–1 for the first time since 2015. This game marked the 12th game with an upset in Week 1 during the 2021 NFL season an NFL record.

==== Week 2: Baltimore Ravens 36, Kansas City Chiefs 35 ====
Week 2: Kansas City Chiefs at Baltimore Ravens – Game summary

Quarter	1	2	3	4	Total
Chiefs	14	7	14	0	**35**
**Ravens**	7	10	7	12	**36**

at M&T Bank Stadium, Baltimore, Maryland

- Date: September 19
- Game time: 8:20 p.m. EDT
- Game weather: Clear, 73 °F (23 °C)
- Game attendance: 70,417
- Referee: Clete Blakeman
- TV announcers (NBC): Al Michaels, Cris Collinsworth and Michele Tafoya
- Recap, Game Book

Game information

**First quarter**

- KC – Tyrann Mathieu 34-yard interception return (Harrison Butker kick), 14:10. Chiefs 7–0.
- BAL – Devin Duvernay fumble recovery in end zone (Justin Tucker kick), 10:36. Tied 7–7. **Drive: 6 plays, 75 yards, 3:34.**
- KC – Demarcus Robinson 33-yard pass from Patrick Mahomes (Harrison Butker kick), 6:05. Chiefs 14–7. **Drive: 8 plays, 92 yards, 4:31.**

**Second quarter**

- BAL – Latavius Murray 5-yard run (Justin Tucker kick), 3:21. Tied 14–14. **Drive: 9 plays, 72 yards, 5:31.**
- KC – Darrel Williams 2-yard run (Harrison Butker kick), 0:51. Chiefs 21–14. **Drive: 7 plays, 67 yards, 2:30.**
- BAL – Justin Tucker 43-yard field goal, 0:03. Chiefs 21–17. **Drive: 7 plays, 50 yards, 0:48.**

**Third quarter**

- KC – Byron Pringle 40-yard pass from Patrick Mahomes (Harrison Butker kick), 11:53. Chiefs 28–17. **Drive: 5 plays, 74 yards, 3:07.**
- BAL – Marquise Brown 42-yard pass from Lamar Jackson (Justin Tucker kick), 9:30. Chiefs 28–24. **Drive: 4 plays, 75 yards, 2:23.**
- KC – Travis Kelce 46-yard pass from Patrick Mahomes (Harrison Butker kick), 6:50. Chiefs 35–24. **Drive: 6 plays, 75 yards, 2:40.**

**Fourth quarter**

- BAL – Lamar Jackson 2-yard run (pass failed), 14:13. Chiefs 35–30. **Drive: 5 plays, 56 yards, 2:48.**
- BAL – Lamar Jackson 1-yard run (pass failed), 3:14. Ravens 36–35. **Drive: 14 plays, 68 yards, 8:02.**

**Top passers**

- KC – Patrick Mahomes – 24/31, 343 yards, 3 TD, INT
- BAL – Lamar Jackson – 18/26, 239 yards, TD, 2 INT

**Top rushers**

- KC – Clyde Edwards-Helaire – 13 rushes, 46 yards
- BAL – Lamar Jackson – 16 rushes, 107 yards, 2 TD

**Top receivers**

- KC – Travis Kelce – 7 receptions, 109 yards, TD
- BAL – Marquise Brown – 6 receptions, 113 yards, TD

The Ravens overcame two 11-point 2nd half deficits to stun the Chiefs 36–35 on Sunday Night Football, avoiding an 0–2 start. Lamar Jackson ran for two fourth quarter touchdowns on consecutive drives, overcoming two first quarter interceptions, the former of which was a Pick 6, by Tyrann Mathieu. Kansas City then drove into field goal range, but rookie outside linebacker Odafe Oweh forced and recovered a fumble by Clyde Edwards-Helaire at the Baltimore 34-yard line with 1:20 left to go in regulation. The Ravens then forced the Chiefs to use all 3 of their timeouts before Jackson sealed the win with a 2-yard run on 4th and 1 from the Baltimore 43. It was Jackson's first ever win over Patrick Mahomes in four tries as well as the largest deficit he's overcome in his career. It was also the Ravens’ first win over the Chiefs since their 2012 Super Bowl season. With the win, the Ravens improved to 1–1.

==== Week 3: Baltimore Ravens 19, Detroit Lions 17 ====
Week 3: Baltimore Ravens at Detroit Lions – Game summary

Quarter	1	2	3	4	Total
**Ravens**	0	10	6	3	**19**
Lions	0	0	7	10	**17**

at Ford Field, Detroit, Michigan

- Date: September 26
- Game time: 1:00 p.m. EDT
- Game weather: None (indoor stadium)
- Game attendance: 50,788
- Referee: Scott Novak
- TV announcers (CBS): Greg Gumbel, Adam Archuleta, and AJ Ross
- Recap, Game Book

Game information

**First quarter**

- No scoring plays.

**Second quarter**

- BAL – Justin Tucker 39-yard field goal, 10:05. Ravens 3–0. **Drive: 6 plays, 25 yards, 2:21.**
- BAL – Devin Duvernay 19-yard pass from Lamar Jackson (Justin Tucker kick), 3:15. Ravens 10–0. **Drive: 8 plays, 65 yards, 3:39.**

**Third quarter**

- BAL – Justin Tucker 50-yard field goal, 12:16. Ravens 13–0. **Drive: 7 plays, 43 yards, 2:44.**
- DET – D'Andre Swift 2-yard run (Ryan Santoso kick), 5:21. Ravens 13–7. **Drive: 11 plays, 75 yards, 6:55.**
- BAL – Justin Tucker 32-yard field goal, 0:41. Ravens 16–7. **Drive: 10 plays, 61 yards, 4:40.**

**Fourth quarter**

- DET – Jamaal Williams 1-yard run (Ryan Santoso kick), 8:16. Ravens 16–14. **Drive: 12 plays, 75 yards, 7:25.**
- DET – Ryan Santoso 35-yard field goal, 1:04. Lions 17–16. **Drive: 9 plays, 62 yards, 4:21.**
- BAL – Justin Tucker 66-yard field goal, 0:00. Ravens 19–17. **Drive: 7 plays, 27 yards, 1:04.**

**Top passers**

- BAL – Lamar Jackson – 16/31, 287 yards, TD, INT
- DET – Jared Goff – 22/30, 217 yards

**Top rushers**

- BAL – Lamar Jackson – 7 rushes, 58 yards
- DET – D'Andre Swift – 14 rushes, 47 yards, TD

**Top receivers**

- BAL – Mark Andrews – 5 receptions, 109 yards
- DET – Kalif Raymond – 6 receptions, 68 yards

The Ravens survived a fourth quarter rally by the Detroit Lions to win 19–17 at Ford Field. After trailing 7–16 going into the fourth quarter, the Lions scored 10 unanswered points, taking the lead with 1:04 left to play on a Ryan Santoso 35-yard field goal. On the ensuing possession, the Ravens faced a 4th & 19 deep in their own territory with less than 30 seconds to go, but Lamar Jackson found Sammy Watkins for a long gain out to the Lions 48 yard line. After spiking the ball, Jackson took four more seconds off the clock by throwing the ball out of bounds, leaving only three seconds on the clock. However, the referees missed that the play clock expired before the play, which should have been a five-yard penalty for delay of game. Longtime Ravens kicker Justin Tucker, who missed a 49-yard field goal earlier, then hit a then NFL-record 66-yard field goal as time expired to win the game. With the win, the Ravens improved to 2–1.

==== Week 4: Baltimore Ravens 23, Denver Broncos 7 ====
Week 4: Baltimore Ravens at Denver Broncos – Game summary

Quarter	1	2	3	4	Total
**Ravens**	0	17	0	6	**23**
Broncos	0	7	0	0	**7**

at Empower Field at Mile High, Denver, Colorado

- Date: October 3
- Game time: 4:25 p.m. EDT/2:25 p.m. MDT
- Game weather: Sunny, 76 °F (24 °C)
- Game attendance: 76,490
- Referee: Craig Wrolstad
- TV announcers (CBS): Andrew Catalon, James Lofton, and Amanda Balionis
- Recap, Game Book

Game information

**First quarter**

- No scoring plays.

**Second quarter**

- DEN – Noah Fant 3-yard pass from Teddy Bridgewater (Brandon McManus kick), 14:18. Broncos 7–0. **Drive: 5 plays, 57 yards, 2:07.**
- BAL – Latavius Murray 11-yard run (Justin Tucker kick), 10:21. Tied 7–7. **Drive: 8 plays, 75 yards, 3:57.**
- BAL – Marquise Brown 49-yard pass from Lamar Jackson (Justin Tucker kick), 7:09. Ravens 14–7. **Drive: 4 plays, 60 yards, 1:27.**
- BAL – Justin Tucker 40-yard field goal, 0:00. Ravens 17–7. **Drive: 5 plays, 4 yards, 0:31.**

**Third quarter**

- No scoring plays.

**Fourth quarter**

- BAL – Justin Tucker 46-yard field goal, 13:37. Ravens 20–7. **Drive: 13 plays, 48 yards, 5:41.**
- BAL – Justin Tucker 20-yard field goal, 1:51. Ravens 23–7. **Drive: 15 plays, 78 yards, 6:35.**

**Top passers**

- BAL – Lamar Jackson – 22/37, 316 yards, TD
- DEN – Drew Lock – 12/21, 112 yards, INT

**Top rushers**

- BAL – Latavius Murray – 18 rushes, 59 yards, TD
- DEN – Melvin Gordon – 9 rushes, 57 yards

**Top receivers**

- BAL – Marquise Brown – 4 receptions, 91 yards, TD
- DEN – Courtland Sutton – 3 receptions, 47 yards

Facing a 0–7 deficit after a slow start, the Ravens rattled off 17 second quarter points and defeated the Denver Broncos 23–7 for their third straight win. Lamar Jackson threw for 316 yards and a touchdown, his first 300-yard passing game since Week 1 of the 2019 season, while adding 28 yards on the ground. The Ravens also tied the record for most consecutive games rushing over 100 yards as a team with 43 (tied with their division rival, the Steelers) with a 5-yard run by Jackson on the last play of the game. With their third-straight win, the Ravens improved to 3–1.

==== Week 5: Baltimore Ravens 31, Indianapolis Colts 25 (OT) ====
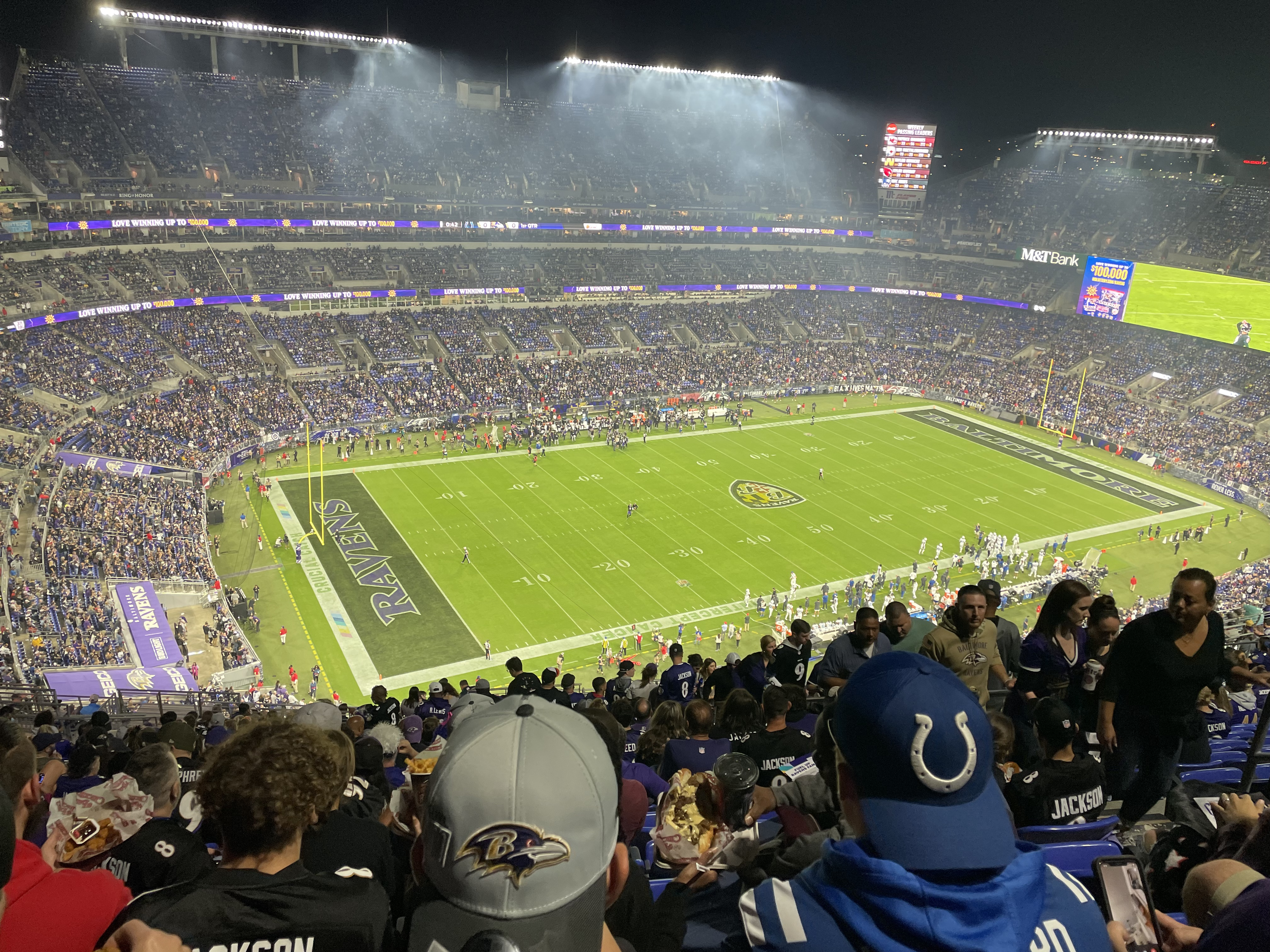
M&T Bank Stadium at night during the Ravens Monday Night Matchup vs the Colts

Week 5: Indianapolis Colts at Baltimore Ravens – Game summary

Quarter	1	2	3	4	OT	Total
Colts	7	3	12	3	0	**25**
**Ravens**	0	3	6	16	6	**31**

at M&T Bank Stadium, Baltimore, Maryland

- Date: October 11
- Game time: 8:15 p.m. EDT
- Game weather: Cloudy, 69 °F (21 °C)
- Game attendance: 70,510
- Referee: Land Clark
- TV announcers (ESPN): Steve Levy, Brian Griese, Louis Riddick, and Lisa Salters
- Recap, Game Book

Game information

**First quarter**

- IND – Jonathan Taylor 76-yard pass from Carson Wentz (Rodrigo Blankenship kick), 12:59. Colts 7–0. **Drive: 3 plays, 71 yards, 0:23.**

**Second quarter**

- BAL – Justin Tucker 23-yard field goal, 1:36. Colts 7–3. **Drive: 9 plays, 80 yards, 2:49.**
- IND – Rodrigo Blankenship 37-yard field goal, 0:00. Colts 10–3. **Drive: 8 plays, 56 yards, 1:36.**

**Third quarter**

- IND – Michael Pittman Jr. 42-yard pass from Carson Wentz (kick failed), 13:59. Colts 16–3. **Drive: 2 plays, 73 yards, 1:01.**
- IND – Jonathan Taylor 4-yard run (pass failed), 3:06. Colts 22–3. **Drive: 6 plays, 81 yards, 3:36.**
- BAL – Marquise Brown 43-yard pass from Lamar Jackson (run failed), 0:56. Colts 22–9. **Drive: 5 plays, 75 yards, 2:10.**

**Fourth quarter**

- IND – Rodrigo Blankenship 43-yard field goal, 12:00. Colts 25–9. **Drive: 9 plays, 55 yards, 3:56.**
- BAL – Mark Andrews 5-yard pass from Lamar Jackson (Lamar Jackson–Mark Andrews pass), 9:38. Colts 25–17. **Drive: 6 plays, 78 yards, 2:22.**
- BAL – Mark Andrews 4-yard pass from Lamar Jackson (Lamar Jackson–Mark Andrews pass), 0:39. Tied 25–25. **Drive: 11 plays, 75 yards, 3:50.**

**Overtime**

- BAL – Marquise Brown 5-yard pass from Lamar Jackson, 5:24. Ravens 31–25. **Drive: 10 plays, 68 yards, 4:36.**

**Top passers**

- IND – Carson Wentz – 25/35, 402 yards, 2 TD
- BAL – Lamar Jackson – 37/43, 442 yards, 4 TD

**Top rushers**

- IND – Jonathan Taylor – 15 rushes, 53 yards, TD
- BAL – Lamar Jackson – 14 rushes, 62 yards

**Top receivers**

- IND – Jonathan Taylor – 3 receptions, 116 yards, TD
- BAL – Mark Andrews – 11 receptions, 147 yards, 2 TD

Trailing 3–22 late in the third quarter, the Ravens scored four touchdowns in as many drives to defeat the Colts in overtime 31–25 on Monday Night Football. Lamar Jackson had 442 yards passing, both a career high and franchise record, and four touchdowns while adding 62 yards rushing. The Colts also had a field goal blocked with 4:37 left in the fourth quarter and missed a potential game winner at the end of regulation. It was the largest deficit (19 points) that Jackson had overcome in a game, beating out the 11-point deficits he overcame against the Kansas City Chiefs earlier in the season. With their fourth straight win, the Ravens improved to 4–1 and moved into first place in the AFC North due to losses by both the Cleveland Browns and the Cincinnati Bengals.

==== Week 6: Baltimore Ravens 34, Los Angeles Chargers 6 ====
Week 6: Los Angeles Chargers at Baltimore Ravens – Game summary

Quarter	1	2	3	4	Total
Chargers	0	6	0	0	**6**
**Ravens**	7	10	10	7	**34**

at M&T Bank Stadium, Baltimore, Maryland

- Date: October 17
- Game time: 1:00 p.m. EDT
- Game weather: Partly Cloudy, 63 °F (17 °C)
- Game attendance: 70,704
- Referee: Bill Vinovich
- TV announcers (CBS): Greg Gumbel, Adam Archuleta, and AJ Ross
- Recap, Game Book

Game information

**First quarter**

- BAL – Latavius Murray 14-yard run (Justin Tucker kick), 5:12. Ravens 7–0. **Drive: 12 plays, 90 yards, 6:39.**

**Second quarter**

- BAL – Le'Veon Bell 2-yard run (Justin Tucker kick), 13:24. Ravens 14–0. **Drive: 8 plays, 74 yards, 4:55.**
- BAL – Justin Tucker 52-yard field goal, 7:03. Ravens 17–0. **Drive: 4 plays, 5 yards, 2:06.**
- LAC – Jared Cook 1-yard pass from Justin Herbert (kick failed), 4:04. Ravens 17–6. **Drive: 2 plays, 27 yards, 0:16.**

**Third quarter**

- BAL – Mark Andrews 9-yard pass from Lamar Jackson (Justin Tucker kick), 7:39. Ravens 24–6. **Drive: 12 plays, 52 yards, 7:21.**
- BAL – Justin Tucker 39-yard field goal, 5:02. Ravens 27–6. **Drive: 4 plays, 3 yards, 0:53.**

**Fourth quarter**

- BAL – Devonta Freeman 9-yard run (Justin Tucker kick), 14:55. Ravens 34–6. **Drive: 9 plays, 65 yards, 4:45.**

**Top passers**

- LAC – Justin Herbert – 22/39, 195 yards, TD, INT
- BAL – Lamar Jackson – 19/27, 167 yards, TD, 2 INT

**Top rushers**

- LAC – Justin Herbert – 2 rushes, 12 yards
- BAL – Devonta Freeman – 9 rushes, 53 yards, TD

**Top receivers**

- LAC – Keenan Allen – 5 receptions, 50 yards
- BAL – Mark Andrews – 5 receptions, 68 yards, TD

The Ravens used dominant offensive and defensive performances to rout the Chargers 34–6. Baltimore rushed for 187 yards and three touchdowns while the defense held the Chargers to just 208 yards of total offense and only 26 rushing yards while holding the ball for over 38 minutes. The victory was Lamar Jackson's 35th as a starter, setting the record for the most wins by a starting quarterback before their 25th birthday in NFL history, surpassing the previous mark of 34 set by Dan Marino. With their fifth straight win, the Ravens improved to 5–1.

==== Week 7: Cincinnati Bengals 41, Baltimore Ravens 17 ====
Week 7: Cincinnati Bengals at Baltimore Ravens – Game summary

Quarter	1	2	3	4	Total
**Bengals**	3	10	14	14	**41**
Ravens	0	10	7	0	**17**

at M&T Bank Stadium, Baltimore, Maryland

- Date: October 24
- Game time: 1:00 p.m. EDT
- Game weather: Cloudy, 61 °F (16 °C)
- Game attendance: 70,659
- Referee: Tony Corrente
- TV announcers (CBS): Kevin Harlan, Trent Green, and Melanie Collins
- Recap, Game Book

Game information

**First quarter**

- CIN – Evan McPherson 52-yard field goal, 5:08. Bengals 3–0. **Drive: 8 plays, 23 yards, 3:54.**

**Second quarter**

- BAL – Justin Tucker 45-yard field goal, 14:03. Tied 3–3. **Drive: 8 plays, 50 yards, 3:27.**
- CIN – C. J. Uzomah 55-yard pass from Joe Burrow (Evan McPherson kick), 6:29. Bengals 10–3. **Drive: 2 plays, 80 yards, 0:37.**
- BAL – Devonta Freeman 1-yard run (Justin Tucker kick), 1:51. Tied 10–10. **Drive: 10 plays, 75 yards, 4:38.**
- CIN – Evan McPherson 30-yard field goal, 0:03. Bengals 13–10. **Drive: 10 plays, 63 yards, 1:48.**

**Third quarter**

- BAL – Marquise Brown 39-yard pass from Lamar Jackson (Justin Tucker kick), 13:20. Ravens 17–13. **Drive: 3 plays, 75 yards, 1:40.**
- CIN – C. J. Uzomah 32-yard pass from Joe Burrow (Evan McPherson kick), 11:06. Bengals 20–17. **Drive: 4 plays, 75 yards, 2:14.**
- CIN – Ja'Marr Chase 82-yard pass from Joe Burrow (Evan McPherson kick), 5:48. Bengals 27–17. **Drive: 3 plays, 90 yards, 1:39.**

**Fourth quarter**

- CIN – Joe Mixon 21-yard run (Evan McPherson kick), 9:24. Bengals 34–17. **Drive: 4 plays, 38 yards, 2:15.**
- CIN – Samaje Perine 46-yard run (Evan McPherson kick), 6:59. Bengals 41–17. **Drive: 2 plays, 44 yards, 0:54.**

**Top passers**

- CIN – Joe Burrow – 23/38, 416 yards, 3 TD, INT
- BAL – Lamar Jackson – 15/31, 257 yards, TD

**Top rushers**

- CIN – Joe Mixon – 12 rushes, 59 yards, TD
- BAL – Lamar Jackson – 12 rushes, 88 yards

**Top receivers**

- CIN – Ja'Marr Chase – 8 receptions, 201 yards, TD
- BAL – Marquise Brown – 5 receptions, 80 yards, TD

The Ravens five-game win streak along with their five-straight wins over the Bengals came to a brutal end as the Bengals scored 28 unanswered second half points and routed them 17–41. The Bengals outgained the Ravens 520–393 and had five sacks as Baltimore was 1 for 4 on fourth downs in the second half. It was the Ravens worst home loss since a 6–35 loss to the Seattle Seahawks in Week 14 of the 2015 season and the first time they've lost at home to the Bengals since Week 17 of the 2017 season. It was also Lamar Jackson's worst loss in his career as well as his first lost in the month of October, and his first loss to the Bengals. With the loss, the Ravens dropped to 5–2 and entered a tie with the Bengals for 1st place in the AFC North.

==== Week 9: Baltimore Ravens 34, Minnesota Vikings 31 (OT) ====
Week 9: Minnesota Vikings at Baltimore Ravens – Game summary

Quarter	1	2	3	4	OT	Total
Vikings	7	10	7	7	0	**31**
**Ravens**	3	7	7	14	3	**34**

at M&T Bank Stadium, Baltimore, Maryland

- Date: November 7
- Game time: 1:00 p.m. EST
- Game weather: Partly cloudy, 58 °F (14 °C)
- Game attendance: 70,599
- Referee: Carl Cheffers
- TV announcers (Fox): Adam Amin, Mark Schlereth and Shannon Spake
- Recap, Game Book

Game information

**First quarter**

- BAL – Justin Tucker 37-yard field goal, 10:34. Ravens 3–0. **Drive: 11 plays, 56 yards, 4:26.**
- MIN – Justin Jefferson 50-yard pass from Kirk Cousins (Greg Joseph kick), 8:32. Vikings 7–3. **Drive: 5 plays, 79 yards, 2:02.**

**Second quarter**

- MIN – Kirk Cousins 1-yard run (Greg Joseph kick), 13:15. Vikings 14–3. **Drive: 10 plays, 94 yards, 6:29.**
- MIN – Greg Joseph 36-yard field goal, 1:25. Vikings 17–3. **Drive: 4 plays, −1 yard, 0:16.**
- BAL – Devonta Freeman 5-yard pass from Lamar Jackson (Justin Tucker kick), 0:19. Vikings 17–10. **Drive: 6 plays, 75 yards, 1:06.**

**Third quarter**

- MIN – Kene Nwangwu 98-yard kickoff return (Greg Joseph kick), 14:47. Vikings 24–10. **Drive: 0 plays, 0 yards, 0:13.**
- BAL – Patrick Ricard 1-yard pass from Lamar Jackson (Justin Tucker kick), 8:39. Vikings 24–17. **Drive: 10 plays, 72 yards, 6:08.**

**Fourth quarter**

- BAL – Devin Duvernay 5-yard pass from Lamar Jackson (Justin Tucker kick), 9:19. Tied 24–24. **Drive: 18 plays, 82 yards, 10:17.**
- BAL – Le'Veon Bell 1-yard run (Justin Tucker kick), 3:29. Ravens 31–24. **Drive: 7 plays, 61 yards, 4:16.**
- MIN – Adam Thielen 1-yard pass from Kirk Cousins (Greg Joseph kick), 1:03. Tied 31–31. **Drive: 10 plays, 75 yards, 2:26.**

**Overtime**

- BAL – Justin Tucker 36-yard field goal, 0:16. Ravens 34–31. **Drive: 10 plays, 72 yards, 5:01.**

**Top passers**

- MIN – Kirk Cousins – 17/28, 187 yards, 2 TD
- BAL – Lamar Jackson – 27/41, 266 yards, 3 TD, 2 INT

**Top rushers**

- MIN – Dalvin Cook – 17 rushes, 110 yards
- BAL – Lamar Jackson – 21 rushes, 120 yards

**Top receivers**

- MIN – Justin Jefferson – 3 receptions, 69 yards, TD
- BAL – Marquise Brown – 9 receptions, 116 yards

The Ravens overcame a slow start, two 14-point deficits, and an overtime interception to defeat the Minnesota Vikings 34–31 in overtime. Trailing 3–17 late in the second quarter, the Ravens scored touchdowns on four consecutive long drives to take 31–24 lead late in the fourth quarter behind three touchdown passes by Lamar Jackson and a touchdown run by Le'Veon Bell. However, the Vikings then drove down and tied the game at 31 on an Adam Thielen touchdown reception from Kirk Cousins, his second touchdown pass of the game. In overtime, the Ravens won the toss and drove into Vikings territory, but the drive abruptly ended when a pass by Jackson was tipped and intercepted by Anthony Barr. The Vikings were unable to capitalize, however, as they went three and out and punted the ball back to the Ravens. Needing only a field goal to win, the Ravens again drove into Vikings territory and won on a 36-yard field goal by Justin Tucker. With the win, the Ravens improved to 6–2.

==== Week 10: Miami Dolphins 22, Baltimore Ravens 10 ====
Week 10: Baltimore Ravens at Miami Dolphins – Game summary

Quarter	1	2	3	4	Total
Ravens	3	0	0	7	**10**
**Dolphins**	0	6	0	16	**22**

at Hard Rock Stadium, Miami Gardens, Florida

- Date: November 11
- Game time: 8:20 p.m. EST
- Game weather: Partly cloudy, 77 °F (25 °C)
- Game attendance: 65,948
- Referee: Ronald Torbert
- TV announcers (Fox/NFLN/Prime Video): Joe Buck, Troy Aikman, Erin Andrews, and Kristina Pink
- Recap, Game Book

Game information

**First quarter**

- BAL – Justin Tucker 46-yard field goal, 9:48. Ravens 3–0. **Drive: 9 plays, 47 yards, 5:12.**

**Second quarter**

- MIA – Jason Sanders 31-yard field goal, 6:18. Tied 3–3. **Drive: 10 plays, 46 yards, 5:14.**
- MIA – Jason Sanders 22-yard field goal, 0:03. Dolphins 6–3. **Drive: 8 plays, 84 yards, 0:48.**

**Third quarter**

- No scoring plays.

**Fourth quarter**

- MIA – Jason Sanders 29-yard field goal, 12:34. Dolphins 9–3. **Drive: 7 plays, 53 yards, 4:05.**
- MIA – Xavien Howard 49-yard fumble return (pass failed), 11:23. Dolphins 15–3.
- BAL – Mark Andrews 5-yard pass from Lamar Jackson (Justin Tucker kick), 4:12. Dolphins 15–10. **Drive: 9 plays, 99 yards, 3:28.**
- MIA – Tua Tagovailoa 1-yard run (Jason Sanders kick), 2:19. Dolphins 22–10. **Drive: 6 plays, 75 yards, 1:53.**

**Top passers**

- BAL – Lamar Jackson – 26/43, 238 yards, TD, INT
- MIA – Tua Tagovailoa – 8/13, 158 yards

**Top rushers**

- BAL – Lamar Jackson – 9 rushes, 39 yards
- MIA – Myles Gaskin – 14 rushes, 31 yards

**Top receivers**

- BAL – Rashod Bateman – 6 receptions, 80 yards
- MIA – Albert Wilson – 4 receptions, 87 yards

The Ravens offense struggled to get anything going against the Miami Dolphins, resulting in a stunning 10–22 upset loss on Thursday Night Football. After the first two drives ended in field goal attempts, the second of which was missed, the Ravens failed to score on nine consecutive drives, with seven of them ending in punts, one ending with a lost fumble by Sammy Watkins – which was returned by Xavien Howard for a touchdown –, while one ended by the end of the first half. Meanwhile, the Dolphins scored 15 unanswered points and held off a late comeback attempt by the Ravens to win their second straight game. With the loss, the Ravens fell to 6–3.

==== Week 11: Baltimore Ravens 16, Chicago Bears 13 ====
Week 11: Baltimore Ravens at Chicago Bears – Game summary

Quarter	1	2	3	4	Total
**Ravens**	0	6	0	10	**16**
Bears	0	0	7	6	**13**

at Soldier Field, Chicago, Illinois

- Date: November 21
- Game time: 1:00 p.m. EST/12:00 p.m. CST
- Game weather: Mostly sunny, 43 °F (6 °C)
- Game attendance: 60,679
- Referee: Shawn Smith
- TV announcers (CBS): Jim Nantz, Tony Romo, and Tracy Wolfson
- Recap, Game Book

Game information

**First quarter**

- No scoring plays.

**Second quarter**

- BAL – Justin Tucker 35-yard field goal, 2:11. Ravens 3–0. **Drive: 10 plays, 49 yards, 6:16.**
- BAL – Justin Tucker 27-yard field goal, 0:02. Ravens 6–0. **Drive: 11 plays, 55 yards, 1:05.**

**Third quarter**

- CHI – Darnell Mooney 60-yard pass from Andy Dalton (Cairo Santos kick), 8:02. Bears 7–6. **Drive: 2 plays, 83 yards, 0:44.**

**Fourth quarter**

- BAL – Justin Tucker 46-yard field goal, 3:41. Ravens 9–7. **Drive: 7 plays, 17 yards, 3:48.**
- CHI – Marquise Goodwin 49-yard pass from Andy Dalton (pass failed), 1:41. Bears 13–9. **Drive: 10 plays, 75 yards, 2:00.**
- BAL – Devonta Freeman 3-yard run (Justin Tucker kick), 0:22. Ravens 16–13. **Drive: 5 plays, 72 yards, 1:19.**

**Top passers**

- BAL – Tyler Huntley – 26/36, 219 yards, INT
- CHI – Andy Dalton – 11/23, 201 yards, 2 TD

**Top rushers**

- BAL – Devonta Freeman – 16 rushes, 49 yards, TD
- CHI – David Montgomery – 14 rushes, 58 yards

**Top receivers**

- BAL – Mark Andrews – 8 receptions, 73 yards
- CHI – Darnell Mooney – 5 receptions, 121 yards, TD

Playing without star quarterback Lamar Jackson due to an illness, the Ravens behind second-year QB Tyler Huntley rallied in the final minute to defeat the Chicago Bears 16–13. Earlier in the week, Jackson had designated as questionable due to an undisclosed non-COVID illness. He was removed from the injury report that Friday, but was reinserted on it the next day when his condition abruptly degraded before being ruled out on gameday. Without Jackson, along with wide receiver Marquise Brown, the Ravens struggled to move the ball, but were able to do just enough to take a 9–7 lead late in the fourth quarter on a Justin Tucker 46-yard field goal. On the ensuing drive, however, Andy Dalton, who was in for Justin Fields after the latter suffered a rib injury in the third quarter, threw his second touchdown pass of the day to Marquise Goodwin from 49-yards out on 4th and 11 with less than 1:45 left to go in regulation. Trailing by four after the Bears failed on the two-point conversion, the Ravens quickly drove down the field and retook the lead on a Devonta Freeman 3-yard run touchdown run with just 0:22 to go. The Bears were unable to get into field goal range on their final drive and Dalton was sacked by Tyus Bowser before the former could get off a hail mary throw on the last play of the game. It was the first time the Ravens had defeated the Bears at Soldier Field (they were 0–3 in the stadium prior to this game). With the win, the Ravens improved to 7–3.

==== Week 12: Baltimore Ravens 16, Cleveland Browns 10 ====
Week 12: Cleveland Browns at Baltimore Ravens – Game summary

Quarter	1	2	3	4	Total
Browns	0	3	7	0	**10**
**Ravens**	3	3	7	3	**16**

at M&T Bank Stadium, Baltimore, Maryland

- Date: November 28
- Game time: 8:20 p.m. EST
- Game weather: Cloudy, 45 °F (7 °C)
- Game attendance: 70,355
- Referee: Jerome Boger
- TV announcers (NBC): Mike Tirico, Cris Collinsworth and Kathryn Tappen
- Recap, Game Book

Game information

**First quarter**

- BAL – Justin Tucker 52-yard field goal, 0:24. Ravens 3–0. **Drive: 9 plays, 41 yards, 3:38.**

**Second quarter**

- BAL – Justin Tucker 25-yard field goal, 3:53. Ravens 6–0. **Drive: 17 plays, 59 yards, 8:41.**
- CLE – Chase McLaughlin 46-yard field goal, 1:02. Ravens 6–3. **Drive: 7 plays, 25 yards, 1:27.**

**Third quarter**

- BAL – Mark Andrews 13-yard pass from Lamar Jackson (Justin Tucker kick), 9:48. Ravens 13–3. **Drive: 10 plays, 75 yards, 5:12.**
- CLE – David Njoku 20-yard pass from Baker Mayfield (Chase McLaughlin kick), 0:39. Ravens 13–10. **Drive: 5 plays, 87 yards, 2:30.**

**Fourth quarter**

- BAL – Justin Tucker 49-yard field goal, 1:10. Ravens 16–10. **Drive: 11 plays, 45 yards, 5:18.**

**Top passers**

- CLE – Baker Mayfield – 18/37, 247 yards, TD
- BAL – Lamar Jackson – 20/32, 165 yards, TD, 4 INT

**Top rushers**

- CLE – Kareem Hunt – 7 rushes, 20 yards
- BAL – Lamar Jackson – 17 rushes, 68 yards

**Top receivers**

- CLE – Jarvis Landry – 6 receptions, 111 yards
- BAL – Mark Andrews – 4 receptions, 65 yards, TD

Lamar Jackson and the Ravens overcame four interceptions, including three straight in as many drives in the second quarter, and won their second consecutive game with a 16–10 victory on Sunday Night Football. The Ravens improved to 8–3 and gained control on the number one seed in the AFC.

==== Week 13: Pittsburgh Steelers 20, Baltimore Ravens 19 ====
Week 13: Baltimore Ravens at Pittsburgh Steelers – Game summary

Quarter	1	2	3	4	Total
Ravens	7	0	3	9	**19**
**Steelers**	0	3	0	17	**20**

at Heinz Field, Pittsburgh, Pennsylvania

- Date: December 5
- Game time: 4:25 p.m. EST
- Game weather: Cloudy, 50 °F (10 °C)
- Game attendance: 59,303
- Referee: Scott Novak
- TV announcers (CBS): Jim Nantz, Tony Romo, and Tracy Wolfson
- Recap, Game Book

Game information

**First quarter**

- No scoring plays.

**Second quarter**

- BAL – Devonta Freeman 3-yard run (Justin Tucker kick), 8:37. Ravens 7–0. **Drive: 16 plays, 99 yards, 10:27.**
- PIT – Chris Boswell 53-yard field goal, 0:27. Ravens 7–3. **Drive: 9 plays, 52 yards, 1:21.**

**Third quarter**

- BAL – Justin Tucker 35-yard field goal, 7:24. Ravens 10–3. **Drive: 10 plays, 41 yards, 5:20.**

**Fourth quarter**

- PIT – Diontae Johnson 29-yard pass from Ben Roethlisberger (kick failed), 14:01. Ravens 10–9. **Drive: 4 plays, 78 yards, 1:38.**
- BAL – Justin Tucker 28-yard field goal, 11:51. Ravens 13–9. **Drive: 5 plays, 51 yards, 2:10.**
- PIT – Chris Boswell 43-yard field goal, 7:18. Ravens 13–12. **Drive: 10 plays, 50 yards, 4:33.**
- PIT – Diontae Johnson 5-yard pass from Ben Roethlisberger (Ben Roethlisberger–Pat Freiermuth pass), 1:48. Steelers 20–13. **Drive: 11 plays, 69 yards, 4:33.**
- BAL – Sammy Watkins 5-yard pass from Lamar Jackson (pass failed), 0:12. Steelers 20–19. **Drive: 8 plays, 60 yards, 1:36.**

**Top passers**

- BAL – Lamar Jackson – 23/37, 253 yards, TD, INT
- PIT – Ben Roethlisberger – 21/31, 236 yards, 2 TD

**Top rushers**

- BAL – Lamar Jackson – 8 rushes, 55 yards
- PIT – Najee Harris – 21 rushes, 71 yards

**Top receivers**

- BAL – Marquise Brown – 5 receptions, 55 yards
- PIT – Diontae Johnson – 8 receptions, 105 yards, 2 TD

The Ravens blew a fourth quarter lead, allowing the Steelers to get 17 points before failing on a two-point conversion on a last-minute touchdown, losing 19–20. Going into the fourth quarter, the Ravens led 10–3, but the Steelers outscored them 17–3, taking a 20–13 lead on a Ben Roethlisberger touchdown pass to Diontae Johnson along with a two-point conversion. The Ravens then quickly drove down the field and Lamar Jackson threw a short touchdown pass to Sammy Watkins with only 12 seconds left. Due to losing CB Marlon Humphrey earlier in the game, leaving them with only 5 CBs available to play, the Ravens attempted to win the game by going for two instead of tying it with an extra point. However, Lamar Jackson pass to Mark Andrews on the attempt was off-target and Andrews was unable to catch it, leaving the Ravens down by one. The Steelers then recovered the onside kick and ran out the clock. With the loss, the Ravens fell to 8–4 out and dropped from the number 1 seed to the 3 seed.

==== Week 14: Cleveland Browns 24, Baltimore Ravens 22 ====
Week 14: Baltimore Ravens at Cleveland Browns – Game summary

Quarter	1	2	3	4	Total
Ravens	0	6	3	13	**22**
**Browns**	10	14	0	0	**24**

at FirstEnergy Stadium, Cleveland, Ohio

- Date: December 12
- Game time: 1:00 p.m. EST
- Game weather: Sunny, 47 °F (8 °C)
- Game attendance: 67,431
- Referee: Brad Rogers
- TV announcers (CBS): Kevin Harlan, Trent Green, and Melanie Collins
- Recap, Game Book

Game information

**First quarter**

- CLE – Chase McLaughlin 43-yard field goal, 7:30. Browns 3–0. **Drive: 7 plays, 60 yards, 3:50.**
- CLE – Jarvis Landry 9-yard pass from Baker Mayfield (Chase McLaughlin kick), 0:38. Browns 10–0. **Drive: 8 plays, 66 yards, 4:58.**

**Second quarter**

- CLE – Austin Hooper 1-yard pass from Baker Mayfield (Chase McLaughlin kick), 8:15. Browns 17–0. **Drive: 10 plays, 77 yards, 6:05.**
- BAL – Justin Tucker 50-yard field goal, 3:30. Browns 17–3. **Drive: 4 plays, 7 yards, 1:54.**
- CLE – Myles Garrett 15-yard fumble return (Chase McLaughlin kick), 0:49. Browns 24–3.
- BAL – Justin Tucker 42-yard field goal, 0:02. Browns 24–6. **Drive: 7 plays, 53 yards, 0:47.**

**Third quarter**

- BAL – Justin Tucker 55-yard field goal, 2:05. Browns 24–9. **Drive: 9 plays, 46 yards, 4:40.**

**Fourth quarter**

- BAL – Latavius Murray 1-yard run (pass failed), 8:56. Browns 24–15. **Drive: 7 plays, 69 yards, 2:34.**
- BAL – Mark Andrews 8-yard pass from Tyler Huntley (Justin Tucker kick), 1:17. Browns 24–22. **Drive: 14 plays, 90 yards, 4:09.**

**Top passers**

- BAL – Tyler Huntley – 27/38, 270 yards, TD
- CLE – Baker Mayfield – 22/32, 190 yards, 2 TD, INT

**Top rushers**

- BAL – Devonta Freeman – 13 rushes, 64 yards
- CLE – Nick Chubb – 17 rushes, 59 yards

**Top receivers**

- BAL – Mark Andrews – 11 receptions, 115 yards, TD
- CLE – Donovan Peoples-Jones – 5 receptions, 90 yards

The Ravens lost their second straight game as their late comeback attempt failed in a 22–24 defeat to the Cleveland Browns. The Ravens lost QB Lamar Jackson to an ankle injury in the first quarter and were down 3–24 late in the second quarter. The defense shut out the Browns in the second half and the Ravens recovered an onside kick following their second fourth quarter touchdown, but were unable to convert on 4th and 6 to get into field goal range. With the loss, the Ravens fell to 8–5.

==== Week 15: Green Bay Packers 31, Baltimore Ravens 30 ====
Week 15: Green Bay Packers at Baltimore Ravens – Game summary

Quarter	1	2	3	4	Total
**Packers**	0	14	7	10	**31**
Ravens	7	7	3	13	**30**

at M&T Bank Stadium, Baltimore, Maryland

- Date: December 19
- Game time: 4:25 p.m. EST
- Game weather: Sunny, 43 °F (6 °C)
- Game attendance: 70,815
- Referee: Brad Allen
- TV announcers (Fox): Joe Buck, Troy Aikman, Erin Andrews, and Tom Rinaldi
- Recap, Game Book

Game information

**First quarter**

- BAL – Mark Andrews 8-yard pass from Tyler Huntley (Justin Tucker kick), 2:33. Ravens 7–0. **Drive: 7 plays, 45 yards, 3:32.**

**Second quarter**

- GB – A. J. Dillon 2-yard run (Mason Crosby kick), 12:50. Tied 7–7. **Drive: 8 plays, 84 yards, 4:43.**
- BAL – Mark Andrews 9-yard pass from Tyler Huntley (Justin Tucker kick), 7:11. Ravens 14–7. **Drive: 11 plays, 73 yards, 5:39.**
- GB – Davante Adams 3-yard pass from Aaron Rodgers (Mason Crosby kick), 1:09. Tied 14–14. **Drive: 11 plays, 77 yards, 6:02.**

**Third quarter**

- GB – Aaron Jones 9-yard pass from Aaron Rodgers (Mason Crosby kick), 7:40. Packers 21–14. **Drive: 13 plays, 80 yards, 7:20.**
- BAL – Justin Tucker 38-yard field goal, 3:20. Packers 21–17. **Drive: 9 plays, 55 yards, 4:20.**

**Fourth quarter**

- GB – Marquez Valdes-Scantling 11-yard pass from Aaron Rodgers (Mason Crosby kick), 12:54. Packers 28–17. **Drive: 11 plays, 88 yards, 5:26.**
- GB – Mason Crosby 29-yard field goal, 9:26. Packers 31–17. **Drive: 5 plays, 18 yards, 2:30.**
- BAL – Tyler Huntley 3-yard run (Justin Tucker kick), 4:47. Packers 31–24. **Drive: 12 plays, 75 yards, 4:39.**
- BAL – Tyler Huntley 8-yard run (pass failed), 0:42. Packers 31–30. **Drive: 7 plays, 49 yards, 1:42.**

**Top passers**

- GB – Aaron Rodgers – 23/31, 268 yards, 3 TD
- BAL – Tyler Huntley – 28/40, 215 yards, 2 TD

**Top rushers**

- GB – Aaron Jones – 14 rushes, 58 yards
- BAL – Tyler Huntley – 13 rushes, 73 yards, 2 TD

**Top receivers**

- GB – Marquez Valdes-Scantling – 5 receptions, 98 yards, TD
- BAL – Mark Andrews – 10 receptions, 136 yards, 2 TD

A late Ravens comeback attempt fell short due to failing a two-point conversion after a final minute touchdown in a 30–31 loss to the Green Bay Packers. Playing without QB Lamar Jackson due to an ankle injury, backup QB Tyler Huntley attempted to keep up with the Packers offensive attack led by QB Aaron Rodgers. After going into halftime tied at 14, the Packers went ahead 31–17 about midway through the fourth quarter. Tyler Huntley then led a touchdown drive to cut the lead to 7 while the defense forced a three and out. The Ravens drove again and scored again on Huntley scramble with 42 seconds left, his second touchdown run in as many drives. For the second time in three weeks, the Ravens attempted to go for two to take the lead, but Huntley's pass intended for Mark Andrews was broken up leaving the Ravens down by one. The Packers then recovered the onside kick and ran out the clock. With their third straight loss, the Ravens fell out of the playoff picture and dropped to 8–6.

==== Week 16: Cincinnati Bengals 41, Baltimore Ravens 21 ====
Week 16: Baltimore Ravens at Cincinnati Bengals – Game summary

Quarter	1	2	3	4	Total
Ravens	7	7	0	7	**21**
**Bengals**	10	21	3	7	**41**

at Paul Brown Stadium, Cincinnati, Ohio

- Date: December 26
- Game time: 1:00 p.m. EST
- Game weather: Mostly sunny, 53 °F (12 °C)
- Game attendance: 63,922
- Referee: Clete Blakeman
- TV announcers (CBS): Kevin Harlan, Trent Green and Melanie Collins
- Recap, Game Book

Game information

**First quarter**

- CIN – Evan McPherson 30-yard field goal, 11:06. Bengals 3–0. **Drive: 8 plays, 57 yards, 3:54.**
- BAL – Rashod Bateman 4-yard pass from Josh Johnson (Justin Tucker kick), 5:56. Ravens 7–3. **Drive: 12 plays, 75 yards, 5:10.**
- CIN – Joe Mixon 1-yard run (Evan McPherson kick), 0:27. Bengals 10–7. **Drive: 10 plays, 74 yards, 5:29.**

**Second quarter**

- CIN – Tyler Boyd 68-yard pass from Joe Burrow (Evan McPherson kick), 13:18. Bengals 17–7. **Drive: 2 plays, 71 yards, 0:53.**
- CIN – Joe Mixon 9-yard pass from Joe Burrow (Evan McPherson kick), 7:03. Ravens 24–7. **Drive: 7 plays, 58 yards, 4:00.**
- BAL – Devonta Freeman 2-yard run (Justin Tucker kick), 1:38. Bengals 24–14. **Drive: 13 plays, 90 yards, 5:25.**
- CIN – Tee Higgins 1-yard pass from Joe Burrow (Evan McPherson kick), 0:21. Bengals 31–14. **Drive: 7 plays, 75 yards, 1:17.**

**Third quarter**

- CIN – Evan McPherson 36-yard field goal, 0:40. Bengals 34–14. **Drive: 19 plays, 68 yards, 10:29.**

**Fourth quarter**

- BAL – Mark Andrews 18-yard pass from Josh Johnson (Justin Tucker kick), 14:55. Bengals 34–21. **Drive: 5 plays, 60 yards, 0:45.**
- CIN – Tee Higgins 10-yard pass from Joe Burrow (Evan McPherson kick), 10:05. Bengals 41–21. **Drive: 8 plays, 78 yards, 4:50.**

**Top passers**

- BAL – Josh Johnson – 28/40, 304 yards, 2 TD, INT
- CIN – Joe Burrow – 37/46, 525 yards, 4 TD

**Top rushers**

- BAL – Devonta Freeman – 6 rushes, 17 yards, TD
- CIN – Joe Mixon – 16 rushes, 61 yards, TD

**Top receivers**

- BAL – Mark Andrews – 8 receptions, 125 yards, TD
- CIN – Tee Higgins – 12 receptions, 194 yards, 2 TD

Down to their third-string quarterback, the Ravens were unable to keep up with the Bengals offensive attack and were again blown out 21–41. QB Joe Burrow threw for 525 yards and four touchdowns with 184 yards and two of those touchdowns going to WR Tee Higgins on 12 receptions. With QBs Lamar Jackson (ankle injury) and Tyler Huntley (positive COVID-19 test) both out, recently signed Josh Johnson started for the Ravens, throwing for 304 yards, two touchdowns, and an interception in a losing effort. With the loss, the Ravens fell to 8–7 and were swept by the Bengals for the first time since 2015.

==== Week 17: Los Angeles Rams 20, Baltimore Ravens 19 ====
Week 17: Los Angeles Rams at Baltimore Ravens – Game summary

Quarter	1	2	3	4	Total
**Rams**	0	7	0	13	**20**
Ravens	7	6	3	3	**19**

at M&T Bank Stadium, Baltimore, Maryland

- Date: January 2
- Game time: 1:00 p.m. EST
- Game weather: Cloudy, 62 °F (17 °C)
- Game attendance: 70,328
- Referee: Bill Vinovich
- TV announcers (Fox): Adam Amin, Greg Olsen, and Pam Oliver
- Recap, Game Book

Game information

**First quarter**

- BAL – Chuck Clark 17-yard interception return (Justin Tucker kick), 1:58. Ravens 7–0.

**Second quarter**

- BAL – Justin Tucker 22-yard field goal, 3:41. Ravens 10–0. **Drive: 15 plays, 91 yards, 9:00.**
- LAR – Cooper Kupp 18-yard pass from Matthew Stafford (Matt Gay kick), 0:55. Ravens 10–7. **Drive: 3 plays, 29 yards, 0:34.**
- BAL – Justin Tucker 46-yard field goal, 0:02. Ravens 13–7. **Drive: 9 plays, 51 yards, 0:53.**

**Third quarter**

- BAL – Justin Tucker 46-yard field goal, 4:42. Ravens 16–7. **Drive: 14 plays, 52 yards, 6:23.**

**Fourth quarter**

- LAR – Sony Michel 1-yard run (Matt Gay kick), 12:09. Ravens 16–14. **Drive: 7 plays, 55 yards, 3:48.**
- BAL – Justin Tucker 34-yard field goal, 4:30. Ravens 19–14. **Drive: 12 plays, 59 yards, 7:39.**
- LAR – Odell Beckham Jr. 7-yard pass from Matthew Stafford (pass failed), 0:57. Rams 20–19. **Drive: 9 plays, 75 yards, 3:33.**

**Top passers**

- LAR – Matthew Stafford – 26/35, 309 yards, 2 TD, 2 INT
- BAL – Tyler Huntley – 20/32, 197 yards, INT

**Top rushers**

- LAR – Sony Michel– 19 rushes, 74 yards, TD
- BAL – Devonta Freeman – 14 rushes, 76 yards

**Top receivers**

- LAR – Cooper Kupp – 6 receptions, 95 yards, TD
- BAL – Mark Andrews – 6 receptions, 89 yards

The Ravens blew yet another fourth quarter lead and lost at home to the Los Angeles Rams 19–20. The Ravens took the lead on a 17-yard interception return touchdown by Chuck Clark in the first quarter, the Ravens' first defensive touchdown of the year and the first of three turnovers committed by Matthew Stafford on the day. Clark picked off Stafford again on the next drive and the Ravens extended their lead to 10–0 on the first of four Justin Tucker field goals. They went into halftime up 13–7 and into the fourth quarter up 16–7. The Rams scored a touchdown early in the quarter before the Ravens began another long drive that got them into the red zone late in the quarter. However, the drive stalled and Tucker kicked a chip shot field goal. The Rams then drove again, converting a fourth down in the red zone and took the lead thanks to Matthew Stafford touchdown pass to Odell Beckham Jr. with less than a minute to go. The Ravens were never able to get into field goal range and Huntley was stripped sacked on the last play of the game. With their fifth straight loss, the Ravens fell to 8–8. With the Steelers' win over the Browns on Monday Night, they fell to third place in the AFC North with only a slim chance to make the playoffs the next week.

==== Week 18: Pittsburgh Steelers 16, Baltimore Ravens 13 (OT) ====
Week 18: Pittsburgh Steelers at Baltimore Ravens – Game summary

Quarter	1	2	3	4	OT	Total
**Steelers**	3	0	3	7	3	**16**
Ravens	0	3	7	3	0	**13**

at M&T Bank Stadium, Baltimore, Maryland

- Date: January 9
- Game time: 1:00 p.m. EST
- Game weather: Rain, 38 °F (3 °C)
- Game attendance: 70,453
- Referee: Shawn Hochuli
- TV announcers (CBS): Ian Eagle, Charles Davis, and Evan Washburn
- Recap, Game Book

Game information

**First quarter**

- PIT – Chris Boswell 28-yard field goal, 6:06. Steelers 3–0 . **Drive: 7 plays, 29 yards, 3:51.**

**Second quarter**

- BAL – Justin Tucker 24-yard field goal, 0:11. Tied 3–3 . **Drive: 8 plays, 34 yards, 1:35.**

**Third quarter**

- BAL – Latavius Murray 46-yard run (Justin Tucker kick), 12:32. Ravens 10–3. **Drive: 5 plays, 68 yards, 2:28.**
- PIT – Chris Boswell 40-yard field goal, 7:41. Ravens 10–6 . **Drive: 8 plays, 50 yards, 4:51.**

**Fourth quarter**

- PIT – Chase Claypool 6-yard pass from Ben Roethlisberger (Chris Boswell kick), 2:54. Steelers 13–10. **Drive: 10 plays, 50 yards, 5:13.**
- BAL – Justin Tucker 46-yard field goal, 1:13. Tied 13–13 . **Drive: 7 plays, 40 yards, 1:41.**

**Overtime**

- PIT – Chris Boswell 36-yard field goal, 1:56. Steelers 16–13 . **Drive: 15 plays, 65 yards, 4:28.**

**Top passers**

- PIT – Ben Roethlisberger – 22/32, 244 yards, TD, INT
- BAL – Tyler Huntley – 16/31, 141 yards, 2 INT

**Top rushers**

- PIT – Chase Claypool – 3 rushes, 33 yards
- BAL – Latavius Murray – 16 rushes, 150 yards, TD

**Top receivers**

- PIT – Pat Freiermuth – 6 receptions, 53 yards
- BAL – Mark Andrews – 8 receptions, 85 yards

The Ravens were eliminated from playoff contention with a brutal loss in overtime at home against the Pittsburgh Steelers, resulting in their sixth straight loss.

In the first quarter, the Steelers scored the only points when Chris Boswell kicked a 28-yard field goal to make it 3–0. The Ravens tied it up at 3–3 in the second quarter when Justin Tucker kicked a 24-yard field goal. This would be the score at halftime. In the third quarter, the Ravens moved into the lead when Latavius Murray ran for a 46-yard touchdown to make it 10–3. The Steelers then came within 4 when Boswell kicked a 40-yard field goal, making the score 10–6. The Ravens drove into the red zone on the next drive, but Tyler Huntley, who was replacing Lamar Jackson for the fourth straight game, threw his second interception of the day in end zone early in the fourth quarter. The Steelers retook the lead in the final three minutes of the fourth when Ben Roethlisberger found Chase Claypool on a 6-yard touchdown pass to make it 13–10. Tucker then tied the game up at 13–13 with a 46-yard field goal. In overtime, the Ravens won the toss, but their drive stalled, forcing them to punt. The Steelers were able to drive down the field, converting a 4th & 8 along the way, and eventually Boswell was brought out to kick the game-winning 36-yard field goal to win the game 16–13.

With the loss, the Ravens extended their losing streak to six games and finished the season with a losing record at 8–9 and in last place of the AFC North for the first time since 2007. Even if the Ravens had won, they still would have been eliminated from playoff contention due to the Miami Dolphins defeating the New England Patriots 33–24 later that afternoon.

=== Standings ===
==== Division ====
AFC North
	W	L	T	PCT	DIV	CONF	PF	PA	STK
^{(4)} Cincinnati Bengals	10	7	0	.588	4–2	8–4	460	376	L1
^{(7)} Pittsburgh Steelers	9	7	1	.559	4–2	7–5	343	398	W2
Cleveland Browns	8	9	0	.471	3–3	5–7	349	371	W1
Baltimore Ravens	8	9	0	.471	1–5	5–7	387	392	L6

==== Conference ====
AFC
#	Team	Division	W	L	T	PCT	DIV	CONF	SOS	SOV	STK
**Division winners**
1 (Note: Tennessee finished ahead of Kansas City based on head-to-head victory, claiming the No. 1 seed.)	Tennessee Titans	South	12	5	0	.706	5–1	8–4	.472	.480	W3
2	Kansas City Chiefs	West	12	5	0	.706	5–1	7–5	.538	.517	W1
3	Buffalo Bills	East	11	6	0	.647	5–1	7–5	.472	.428	W4
4	Cincinnati Bengals	North	10	7	0	.588	4–2	8–4	.472	.462	L1
**Wild cards**
5 (Note: Las Vegas claimed the No. 5 seed over New England based on win percentage in common games (5–1 vs. 2–4 against: Miami, Dallas, LA Chargers, Cleveland, and Indianapolis).)	Las Vegas Raiders	West	10	7	0	.588	3–3	8–4	.510	.515	W4
6	New England Patriots	East	10	7	0	.588	3–3	8–4	.481	.394	L1
7	Pittsburgh Steelers	North	9	7	1	.559	4–2	7–5	.521	.490	W2
**Did not qualify for the postseason**
8 (Note: Indianapolis finished ahead of Miami and Los Angeles based on conference record (7–5 vs. 6–6).)	Indianapolis Colts	South	9	8	0	.529	3–3	7–5	.495	.431	L2
9 (Note: Miami finished ahead of LA Chargers based on win percentage in common games (5–1 vs. 2–4 against: New England, Las Vegas, Houston, Baltimore, and NY Giants).)	Miami Dolphins	East	9	8	0	.529	4–2	6–6	.464	.379	W1
10	Los Angeles Chargers	West	9	8	0	.529	3–3	6–6	.510	.500	L1
11 (Note: Cleveland finished ahead of Baltimore based on division record (3–3 vs. 1–5).)	Cleveland Browns	North	8	9	0	.471	3–3	5–7	.514	.415	W1
12	Baltimore Ravens	North	8	9	0	.471	1–5	5–7	.531	.460	L6
13	Denver Broncos	West	7	10	0	.412	1–5	3–9	.484	.357	L4
14 (Note: NY Jets finished ahead of Houston based on head-to-head victory.)	New York Jets	East	4	13	0	.235	0–6	4–8	.512	.426	L2
15	Houston Texans	South	4	13	0	.235	3–3	4–8	.498	.397	L2
16	Jacksonville Jaguars	South	3	14	0	.176	1–5	3–9	.512	.569	W1
**Tiebreakers** (Note: When breaking ties for three or more teams under the NFL's rules, they are first broken within divisions, then comparing only the highest-ranked remaining team from each division.)

== Individual awards ==
Recipient	Award(s)
Mark Andrews	Pro Bowler, First-team All-Pro
Devin Duvernay	Pro Bowler, First-team All-Pro
Lamar Jackson	Week 5: AFC Offensive Player of the WeekPro Bowler
Patrick Ricard	Pro Bowler
Odafe Oweh	Week 2: AFC Defensive Player of the Week
Justin Tucker	Week 3: AFC Special Teams Player of the WeekPro Bowler, First-team All-Pro
