= Jeshaun Jones =

American football player (born 1999)

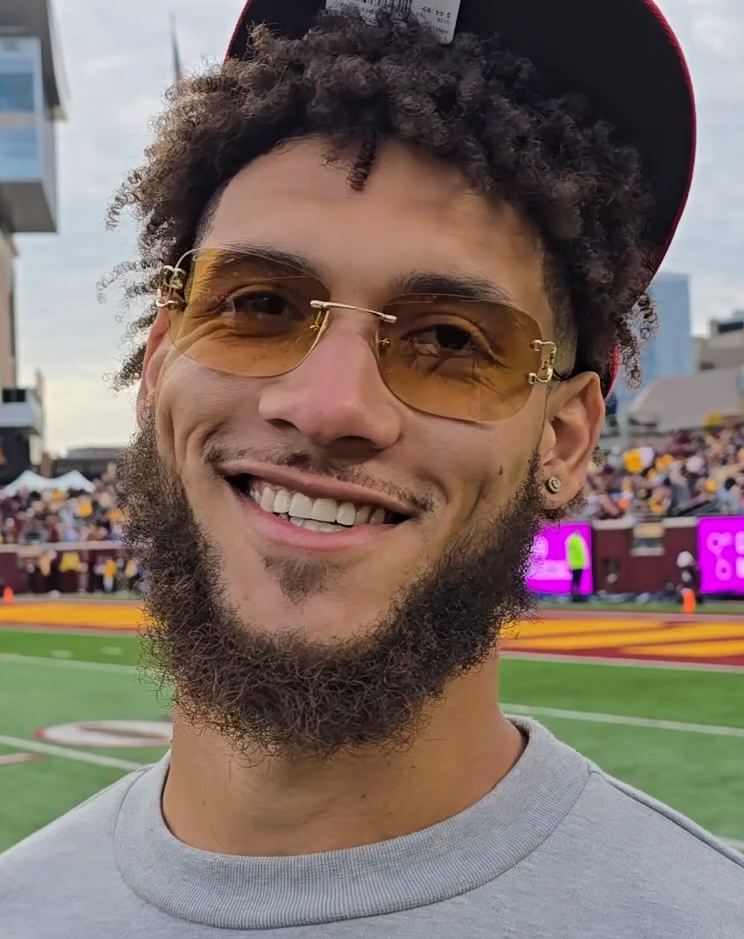
- Jones in 2024

No. 82 – Minnesota Vikings
- Position: Wide receiver
- Roster status: Active

Personal information
- Born: December 22, 1999 (age 26); Fort Myers, Florida, U.S.
- Listed height: 6 ft 1 in (1.85 m)
- Listed weight: 188 lb (85 kg)

Career information
- High school: South Fort Myers
- College: Maryland (2018–2023)
- NFL draft: 2024: undrafted

Career history
- Minnesota Vikings (2024–present)

Awards and highlights
- Third-team All-Big Ten (2023)

Career NFL statistics as of Week 10, 2026
- Receptions: 1
- Receiving yards: 32
- Return yards: 5
- Total tackles: 2
- Stats at Pro Football Reference

Jeshaun Jones (born December 22, 1999) is an American professional football wide receiver for the Minnesota Vikings of the National Football League (NFL). He played college football for the Maryland Terrapins.

== Early life ==
Jones grew up in Fort Myers, Florida and attended South Fort Myers High School where he lettered in football, basketball and baseball. In high school, Jones completed 10 out of 20 passing attempts for 112 yards, a touchdown and an interception. He also rushed 81 carries for 643 yards and four touchdowns along with receiving 63 receptions for 921 yards and nine touchdowns. He was a three-star rated recruit and committed to play college football at the University of Maryland, College Park over offers from Tennessee, Pittsburgh, Iowa State, Nebraska and Minnesota.

== College career ==
During Jones's true freshman season in 2018, he appeared in all 12 games and started two of them. He finished the season with seven touchdowns (two rushing and five receiving) while having the most receiving touchdowns by a freshman since Stefon Diggs in 2012. He also finished with 22 receptions for 288 yards and 18 rushes for 173 yards and a 20-yard passing touchdown. He was also the first freshman in the Big Ten Conference to have two games with a touchdown catch and touchdown run since Maurice Clarett in 2003 when he played for Ohio State.

Prior to the 2019 season, Jones had torn his ACL during the preseason and was redshirted that year.

During the 2020 season, he appeared in and started four games, finishing the season with 11 totaled receptions for 181 yards and a touchdown.

During the 2021 season, he appeared in the first six games and started one of them before suffering a season ending injury. He finished the season with 18 totaled receptions for 224 yards.

During the 2022 season, he appeared in 13 games and started 11 of them, finished the season with 44 receptions for 557 yards, averaging 12.66 yards per receptions and catching four touchdowns.

During the 2023 season, he appeared in and started 12 games, finishing the season with 53 receptions for 747 yards, averaging 14.09 per receptions and catching four receptions.

== Professional career ==
Pre-draft measurables
Height	Weight	Arm length	Hand span	Wingspan	40-yard dash	10-yard split	20-yard split	20-yard shuttle	Three-cone drill	Vertical jump	Broad jump
6 ft 1 1/8 in (1.86 m)	186 lb (84 kg)	31 1/8 in (0.79 m)	8 7/8 in (0.23 m)	6 ft 2 in (1.88 m)	4.51 s	1.55 s	2.64 s	4.15 s	6.95 s	33.5 in (0.85 m)	10 ft 3 in (3.12 m)
All values from Pro Day

Jones signed with the Minnesota Vikings as an undrafted free agent on April 27, 2024. He was waived on August 27, and re-signed to the practice squad, but released the next day. Jones was re-signed to the practice squad on September 10. He signed a reserve/future contract with Minnesota on January 17, 2025.

On August 26, 2025, Jones was waived by the Vikings as part of final roster cuts. He was re-signed to the practice squad the following day. Jones signed a reserve/future contract with Minnesota on January 5, 2026.

On August 25, 2026, Jones was suspended the first three games of the regular season for violating the league's substance abuse policy. On September 29, he reverted to the active roster after he completed serving his three-game suspension. He was waived on October 5 and re-signed to the practice squad two days later. On November 18, he was re-signed to the Vikings active roster.
