= Sammy Watkins =

American football player (born 1993)

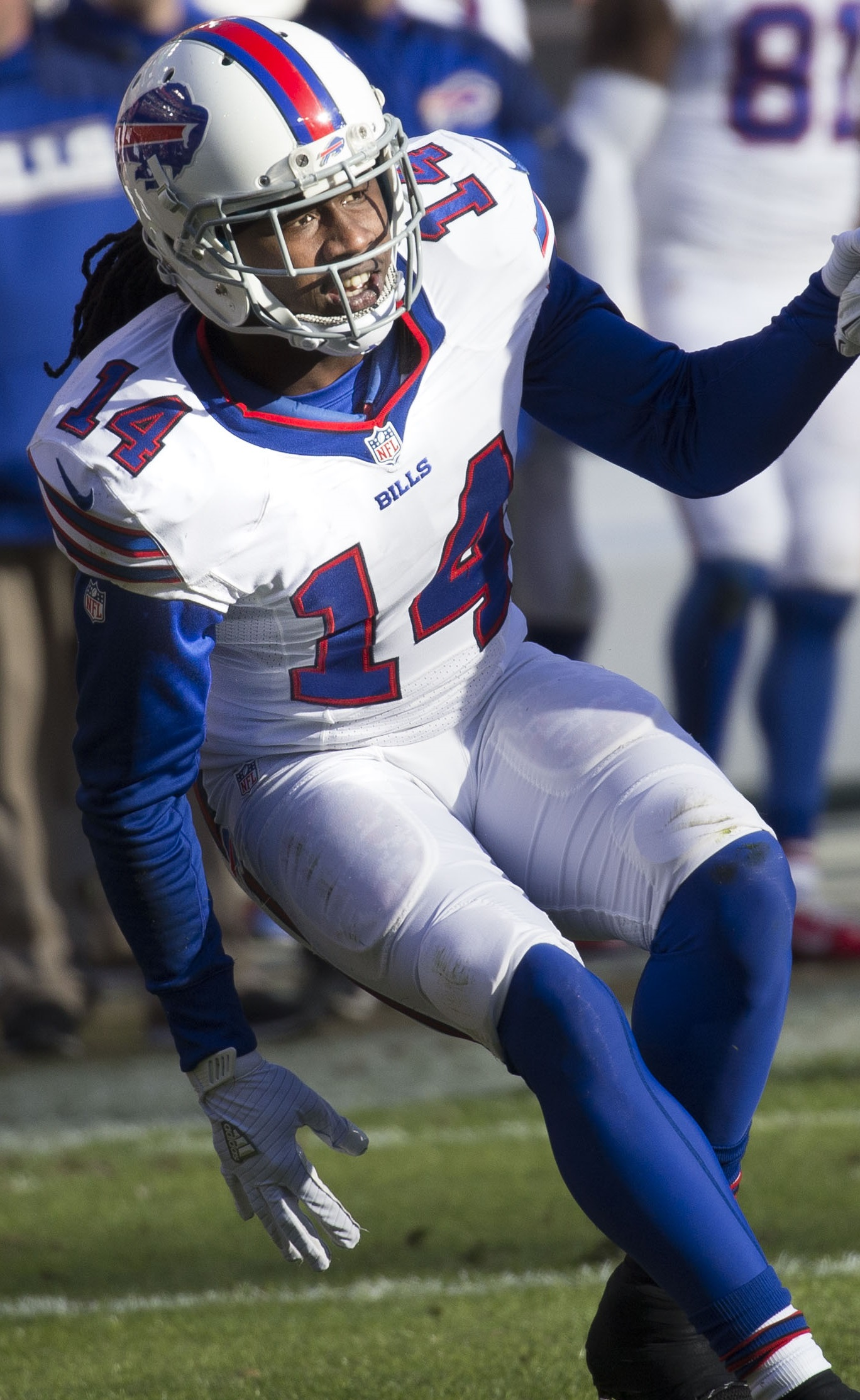
- Watkins with the Buffalo Bills in 2015

No. 14, 12, 11, 82
- Position: Wide receiver

Personal information
- Born: June 14, 1993 (age 33); Fort Myers, Florida, U.S.
- Listed height: 6 ft 1 in (1.85 m)
- Listed weight: 211 lb (96 kg)

Career information
- High school: South Fort Myers
- College: Clemson (2011–2013)
- NFL draft: 2014: 1st round, 4th overall pick

Career history
- Buffalo Bills (2014–2016); Los Angeles Rams (2017); Kansas City Chiefs (2018–2020); Baltimore Ravens (2021); Green Bay Packers (2022); Baltimore Ravens (2022)

Awards and highlights
- Super Bowl champion (LIV); 2× First-team All-American (2011, 2013); 2× First-team All-ACC (2011, 2013); ACC Rookie of the Year (2011); ACC Offensive Rookie of the Year (2011)

Career NFL statistics
- Receptions: 364
- Receiving yards: 5,384
- Receiving touchdowns: 34
- Stats at Pro Football Reference

Sammy Watkins (born June 14, 1993) is an American former professional football player who was a wide receiver in the National Football League (NFL). He played college football for the Clemson Tigers, twice earning first-team All-American honors. Watkins was selected by the Buffalo Bills fourth overall in the 2014 NFL draft. He has also played for the Los Angeles Rams, Kansas City Chiefs, Baltimore Ravens, and Green Bay Packers. Watkins became a Super Bowl champion as a member of the Chiefs.

== Early life ==
Watkins attended South Fort Myers High School in Fort Myers, Florida, where he was a letterman in football, basketball and track & field. He became the all-time leading receiver in the history of Lee County with 133 catches for 2,997 yards and 36 touchdowns during his career. As a sophomore, he had 33 receptions for 537 yards and 10 touchdowns. In his junior and senior years, he was a first-team all-state selection. In his junior year, he added 46 catches for 1,192 yards and 14 touchdowns. As a senior, Watkins had eight 100-yard receiving games on the season, accumulating totals of 54 catches for 1,268 yards and 12 touchdowns. He led an undefeated South Fort Myers team into the 3A state semi-finals, where they lost 44–28 to a Duke Johnson-led Miami Norland team. He played in the 2011 U.S. Army All-American Bowl.

In addition to football, Watkins ran track & field for the Wolfpack, where he was one of the state's top performers in the sprinting events. As a junior, he finished fifth in the 100 meters and sixth in the 200 meters at the state meet. As a senior, he captured the AA state title in the 200 meters, with a PR of 21.11 seconds. He also won the 100 meters at the 2011 Tarpon Invitational, recording a personal-best time of 10.45 seconds.

Watkins was a highly touted recruit before the 2011 college football season. Regarded as a five-star recruit by Rivals.com, he was rated the third-best wide receiver prospect in the nation, behind only George Farmer and Trey Metoyer. He was ranked fifth best by Scout.com. Watkins committed to Clemson University in November 2010. Recruited by dozens of schools, he chose Clemson over offers from Florida, Florida State, Miami (FL), Michigan, and Tennessee.

== College career ==
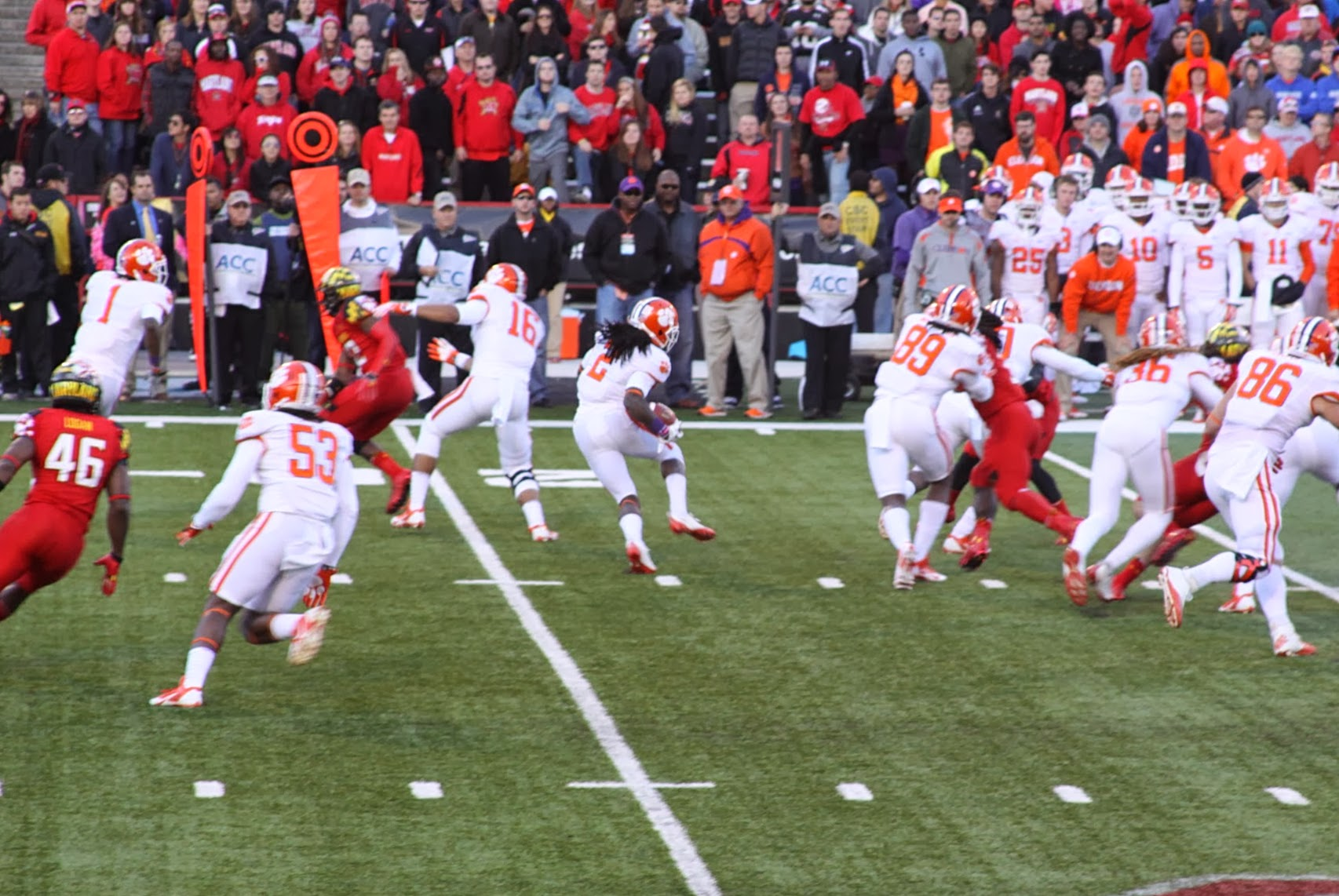
Watkins returns a kickoff during a 2013 game against the Maryland Terrapins

Even though he didn't take part in spring practice, Watkins made an immediate impact for Clemson in his freshman season in 2011. He caught 82 passes for 1,219 yards and 12 touchdowns in his first collegiate season, including 10 catches, 155 yards and two touchdowns against the defending national champion Auburn Tigers. He led the nation in reception yards per game, all-purpose yards and touchdowns. He also broke 11 school freshman records seven games into the season, including total all-purpose yards previously held by C. J. Spiller. Watkins was an Associated Press first-team All-American, becoming only the fourth ever true freshman to do so, joining Herschel Walker, Marshall Faulk and Adrian Peterson. He was also named a Freshman All-American by the Football Writers Association of America.

As a sophomore in 2012, he had 57 receptions for 708 yards and three touchdowns. As a junior, he had 101 receptions for 1,464 yards and 12 touchdowns. He was the MVP of the 2014 Orange Bowl after setting an Orange Bowl record with 16 receptions for 227 yards against the Ohio State Buckeyes. He also set the school record for career receptions in the game finishing with 240.

In January 2014, Watkins announced that he would forgo his senior season and enter the 2014 NFL draft.

== Professional career ==
Pre-draft measurables
Height	Weight	Arm length	Hand span	Wingspan	40-yard dash	10-yard split	20-yard split	20-yard shuttle	Three-cone drill	Vertical jump	Broad jump	Bench press
6 ft 0 3/4 in (1.85 m)	211 lb (96 kg)	32 in (0.81 m)	9 5/8 in (0.24 m)	6 ft 4 1/2 in (1.94 m)	4.43 s	1.55 s	2.59 s	4.34 s	6.95 s	34 in (0.86 m)	10 ft 6 in (3.20 m)	16 reps
All values from NFL Combine

=== Buffalo Bills ===
==== 2014 season ====
Watkins was selected by the Buffalo Bills in the first round as the fourth overall pick in the 2014 NFL draft. Cleveland traded this selection to Buffalo in exchange for Buffalo's 2014 first round selection (the 9th pick, later traded by Cleveland to Minnesota, who used it to select UCLA linebacker Anthony Barr), and their first and fourth round selections in 2015 (19th Cameron Erving C & 115th Ibraheim Campbell S) He was the first wide receiver selected by the Bills in the first round since Lee Evans in 2004, and the earliest wide receiver selected in the draft since A. J. Green in 2011.

On May 28, 2014, Watkins signed his rookie contract, a fully guaranteed four-year deal worth $19.94 million, with a $12.8 million signing bonus. He caught his first career touchdown reception from EJ Manuel in a Week 2 29–10 victory over the Miami Dolphins. In Week 7 against the Minnesota Vikings, Watkins caught nine passes for 122 yards for two touchdowns. His second touchdown was the game winner coming with one second remaining in the game.

Watkins finished his season setting a new Bills rookie record in both receptions (65) and receiving yards (982). In addition to his rookie records, Watkins caught six touchdown passes.

==== 2015 season ====
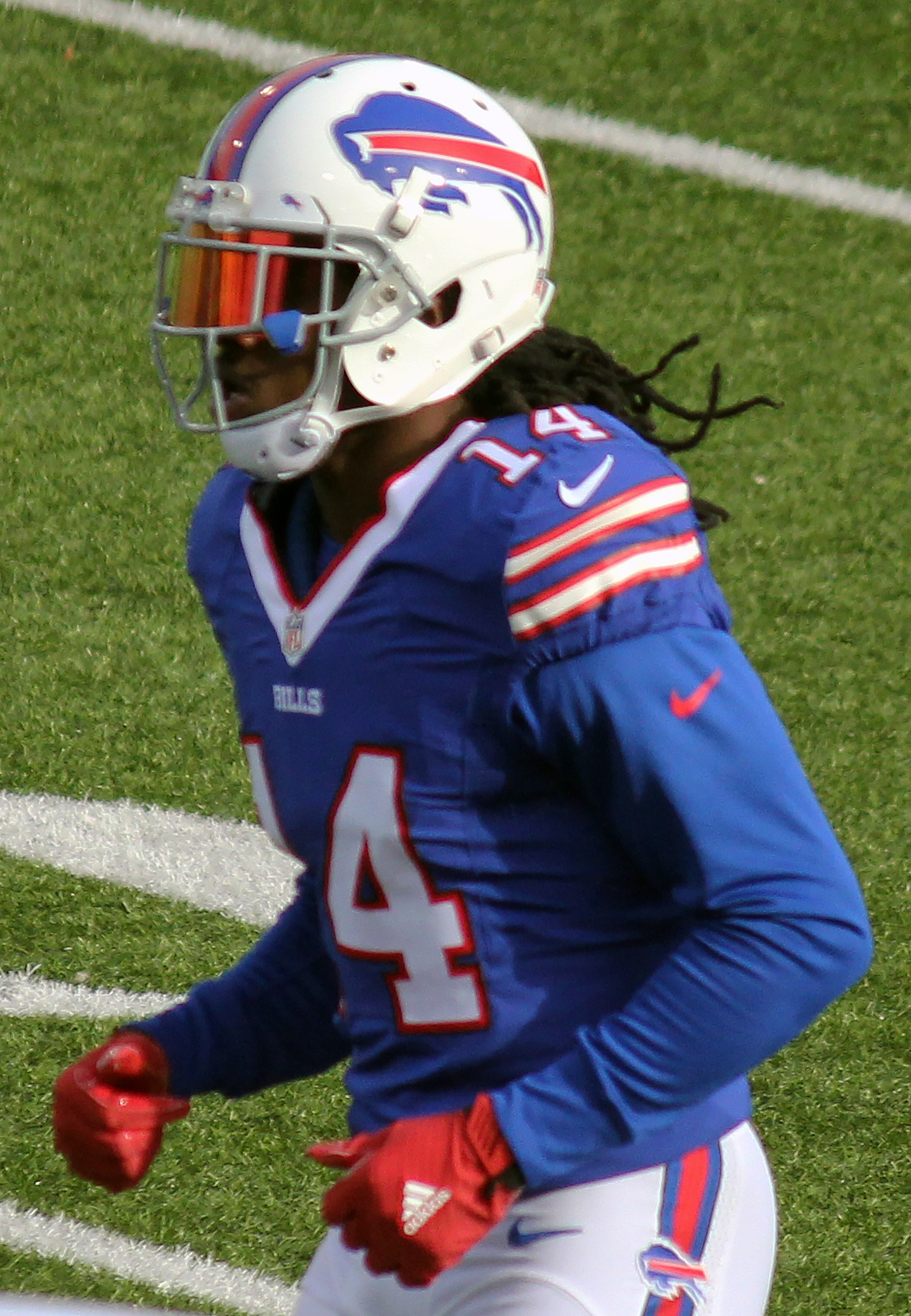
Watkins with the Bills in 2015

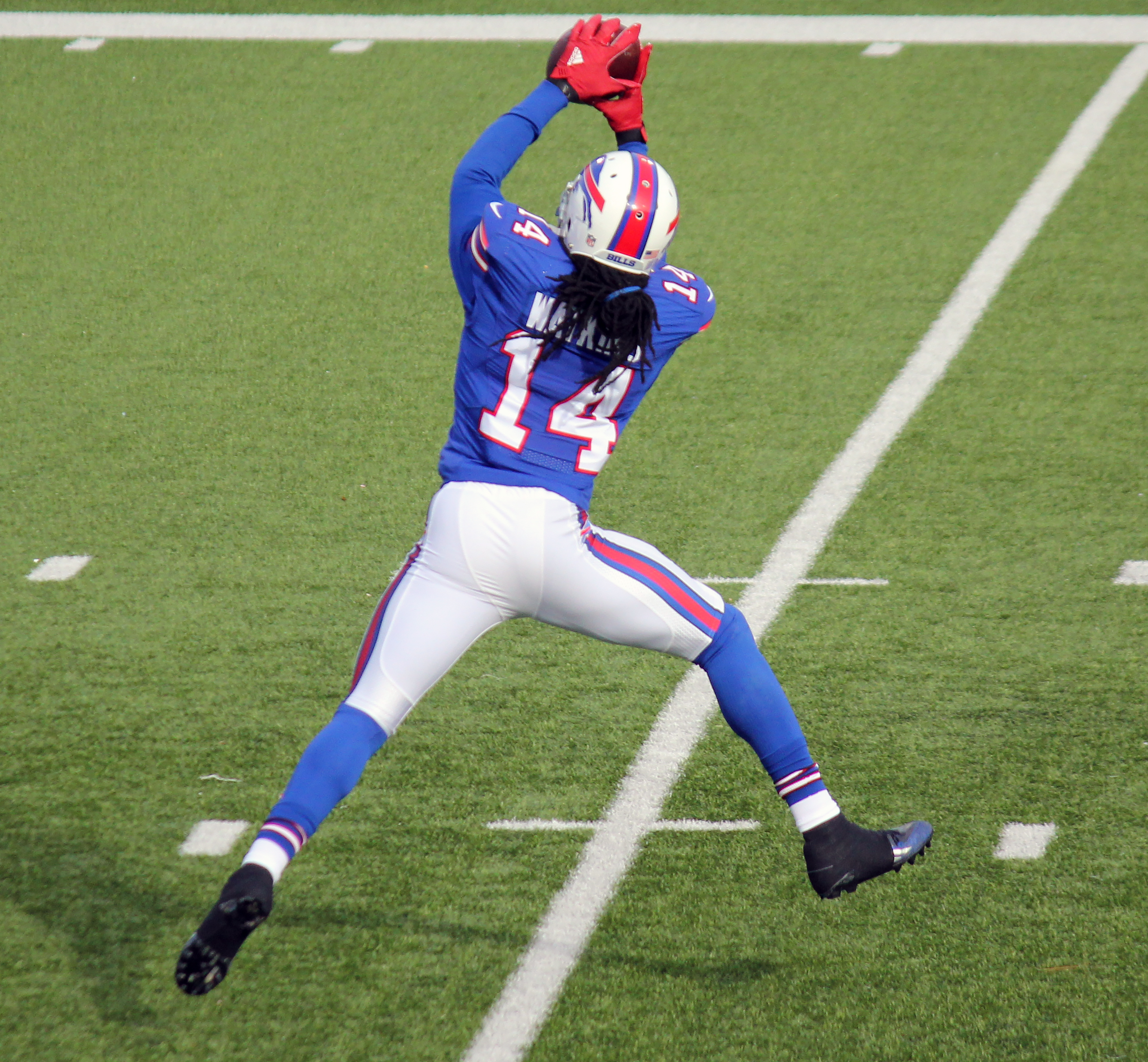
Watkins catching a pass in 2015

Through the first five games of the 2015 season, Watkins (who played in only three of the games because of a calf injury) had just seven catches for 99 yards. He voiced his frustration before game 6, saying "You came up to draft me and I'm not getting targets – that's a problem. You're making me look bad and you're making yourself look bad.... "Why not make both of us look good?"

On October 27, 2015, frustrated with his social media followers for leaving angry comments about him missing three games due to injury, Watkins took to his Instagram and lashed out at critical fans. In a comment which Watkins later deleted, he told the fans to "get a life and go to work" and "continue working y'all little jobs for the rest of y'all lives". This caused an uproar with many Bills fans. Watkins followed up, with a clarification posted on Twitter stating, "Message wasn't for fans (but) for whomever have a problem with athletes being injured." Watkins later posted another Instagram photo addressing the situation, saying his comments were "inappropriate" and acknowledged that a majority of the negative comments were from other fans and not Bills fans.

Playing on an injured ankle that had kept him out of a Friday practice, Watkins had a career-high 168 receiving yards on eight catches with one touchdown in a Week 9 33–17 victory over the Dolphins.

In his first seven games of the season, he caught only 25 passes for 314 yards and three touchdowns, while only having one 100-yard receiving game. In his final six games, however, he had 679 receiving yards on 35 catches (19.4 yards per catch), six touchdowns, and four 100-yard receiving games. He also had at least 80 yards receiving in all six games. With his late season push, Watkins finished the season with 60 catches for 1,047 yards and nine touchdowns receptions. He recorded five 100-yard receiving games and set his career-high in receiving yards and touchdowns. However, the Bills finished the season 8–8 and did not make the playoffs. He was ranked 96th by his fellow players on the NFL Top 100 Players of 2016.

==== 2016 season ====
On May 16, 2016, it was reported that Watkins had broken a small bone in his foot. Watkins had a screw inserted in his foot, and the Bills medical staff was hopeful that would be ready for training camp. On September 30, 2016, he was placed on injured reserve. He was activated off injured reserve on November 26, 2016, prior to Week 12. Watkins finished the 2016 season with 28 receptions for 430 receiving yards and two receiving touchdowns.

On May 2, 2017, the Bills declined Watkins' fifth-year option.

=== Los Angeles Rams ===
On August 11, 2017, Watkins, along with a 2018 sixth-round draft pick, was traded to the Los Angeles Rams in exchange for E. J. Gaines and a 2018 second round draft pick. Watkins recorded his first touchdown of the season with 106 yards against the San Francisco 49ers in Week 3 with a stunning catch for the Rams 41–39 victory. In Week 9, Watkins caught a season-long 67-yard reception from Jared Goff that resulted in a touchdown as part of the 51–17 blowout win by the Rams over the New York Giants. Overall, he finished the 2017 season with 39 receptions for 593 receiving yards and eight receiving touchdowns.

=== Kansas City Chiefs ===
On March 15, 2018, Watkins signed a three-year, $48 million contract with the Kansas City Chiefs. In the 2018 season opener, he recorded three receptions for 21 yards in his Chiefs debut against the Los Angeles Chargers. He recorded six receptions for 100 yards in the following game against the Pittsburgh Steelers. In Week 8, against the Denver Broncos, he had eight receptions for 107 yards and two touchdowns. He finished the 2018 season with 40 receptions for 519 receiving yards and three receiving touchdowns. In the Divisional Round victory over the Indianapolis Colts, he had six receptions for 62 yards. In the AFC Championship overtime loss to the New England Patriots, he had four receptions for 114 yards.

On September 8, 2019, Watkins recorded nine receptions for a career-high 198 yards and three touchdowns against the Jacksonville Jaguars as the Chiefs won 40–26 in Week 1. For the remainder of the regular season, Watkins averaged 36.5 receiving yards per game and had no touchdowns. Overall, in 14 games, Watkins finished the 2019 season with 52 receptions for 673 receiving yards and three receiving touchdowns. In the AFC Championship against the Tennessee Titans, he had seven receptions for 114 receiving yards and a receiving touchdown in the 35–24 victory. In Super Bowl LIV against the 49ers, Watkins caught five passes for 98 yards, including a 38-yard catch on what proved to be the game-winning drive, during the 31–20 win.

In Week 16 against the Atlanta Falcons, Watkins threw an interception to safety Keanu Neal on a trick play during the 17–14 win. Watkins finished the 2020 season with 37 receptions for 421 receiving yards and two receiving touchdowns.

=== Baltimore Ravens (first stint) ===
On April 2, 2021, Watkins signed a one-year, $6 million contract with the Baltimore Ravens. His best game of the season came in Week 1 when he had four receptions for 96 yards in a 33–27 overtime loss to the Las Vegas Raiders. He missed Weeks 6–10 during the season due to injury. He scored his only touchdown during a Week 13 20–19 loss to the Steelers. The touchdown reception would be his final catch of the season. He missed the Week 15 game against the Green Bay Packers due to being placed in the COVID-19 protocol. He finished the year with 27 receptions for 394 yards and a touchdown.

=== Green Bay Packers ===
On April 14, 2022, Watkins signed a one-year $4 million contract with the Packers. On September 24, 2022, Watkins was placed on injured reserve with a hamstring injury. He was activated off injured reserve on October 22. He was released on December 19, 2022.

=== Baltimore Ravens (second stint) ===
On December 20, 2022, Watkins was claimed off waivers by the Ravens following the loss of Devin Duvernay.

== Career statistics ==
=== NFL ===
Legend
	Won the Super Bowl
**Bold**	Career high

==== Regular season ====
Year	Team	Games		Receiving					Fumbles	
Year	Team	GP	GS	Rec	Yds	Avg	Lng	TD	Fum	Lost
2014	BUF	**16**	**16**	**65**	982	15.1	**84**	6	1	**1**
2015	BUF	13	13	60	**1,047**	17.5	63	**9**	0	0
2016	BUF	8	8	28	430	15.4	62	2	0	0
2017	LAR	15	14	39	593	15.2	67	8	0	0
2018	KC	10	9	40	519	13.0	50	3	1	0
2019	KC	14	13	52	673	12.9	68T	3	**2**	**1**
2020	KC	10	9	37	421	11.4	37	2	1	**1**
2021	BAL	13	9	27	394	14.6	49	1	1	**1**
2022	GB	9	3	13	206	15.8	55	0	0	0
2022	BAL	3	2	3	119	**39.7**	47	0	1	**1**
Career		111	96	364	5,384	14.8	84	34	7	5

==== Postseason ====
Year	Team	Games		Receiving					Fumbles	
Year	Team	GP	GS	Rec	Yds	Avg	Lng	TD	Fum	Lost
2017	LAR	1	1	1	23	**23.0**	23	0	0	0
2018	KC	2	2	10	176	17.6	54	0	**1**	**1**
2019	KC	**3**	**3**	**14**	**288**	20.6	**60**	**1**	0	0
2020	KC	1	0	1	13	13.0	13	0	0	0
2022	BAL	1	1	1	12	12.0	12	0	0	0
Career		8	7	27	512	19.0	60	1	1	1

=== College ===
Season	Team	GP	Receiving				Rushing			
Season	Team	GP	Rec	Yds	Avg	TD	Att	Yds	Avg	TD
2011	Clemson	13	82	1,219	14.9	12	32	231	7.2	0
2012	Clemson	10	57	708	12.4	3	14	97	6.9	1
2013	Clemson	13	101	1,464	14.5	12	6	11	1.8	0
Career		36	240	3,391	14.1	27	52	339	6.5	1
Source: sports-reference.com

== Personal life ==
In a pre-draft interview, Watkins said that his favorite football team as a child was the Buffalo Bills. In May 2012, Watkins was arrested by Clemson campus police for possession of marijuana. He was also found to have one pill each of Vyvanse and Adderall and charged with possession of a controlled substance. As a result, Watkins was suspended for the first two games of the 2012–2013 season. Watkins completed pre-trial intervention and had the charge expunged from his record.

His older half brother, Jaylen Watkins, is a former defensive back. Both Sammy and Jaylen were selected in the 2014 NFL draft, 97 picks apart. He has three daughters. Watkins is also the cousin of fellow wide receivers, Austin Watkins Jr. and Winston Watkins Jr.

On July 11, 2014, Watkins was awarded the Key to the City of Fort Myers, the town in which he grew up.

In September 2017, Lindsey Thiry of the Los Angeles Times reported that Watkins believes the Earth is flat.

In a May 2020 interview with Bleacher Report, Watkins opened up about his struggles with mental health and addiction throughout his career, in addition to his spiritual beliefs.
