= Nate McCrary =

American football player (born 1999)

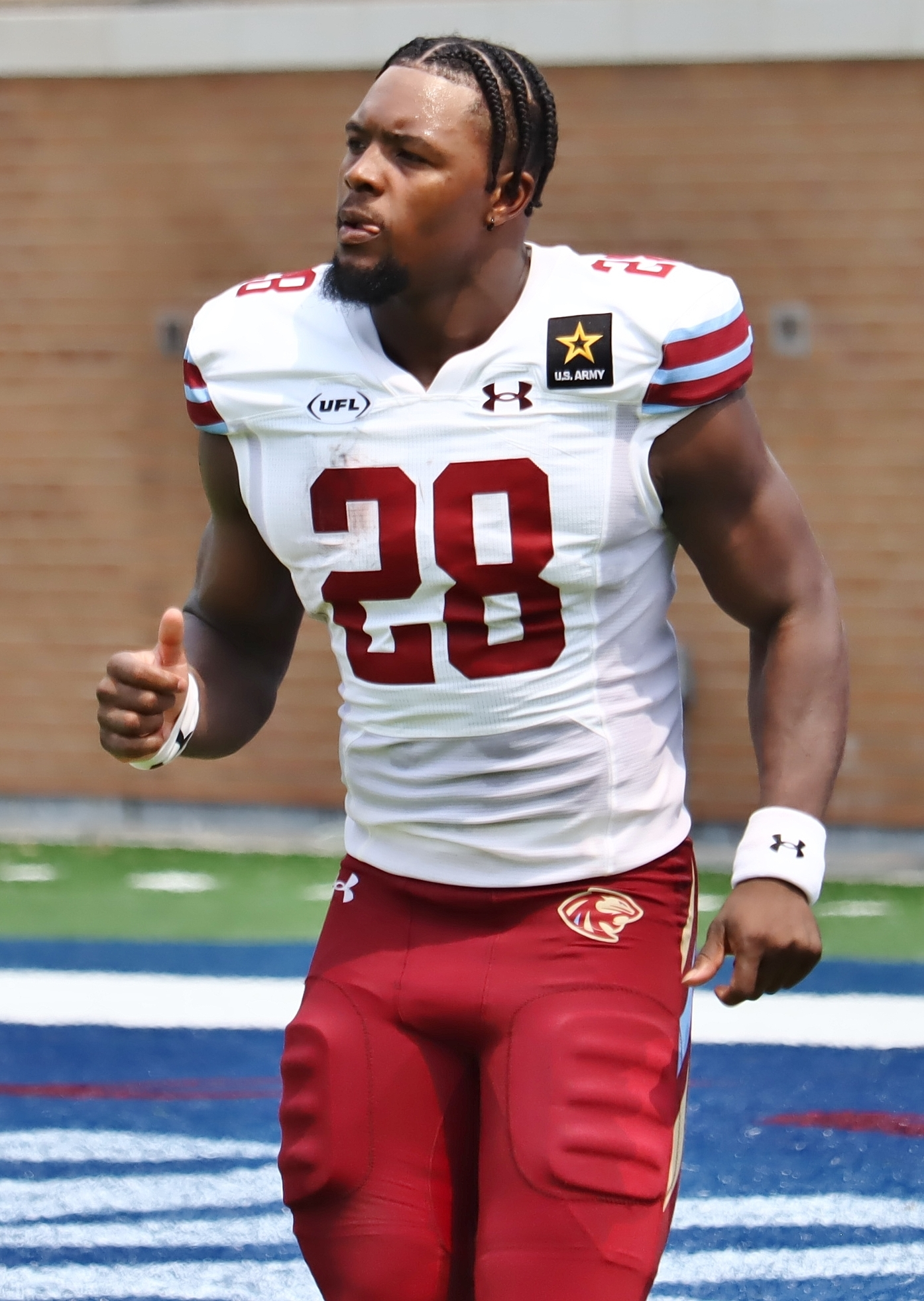
- McCrary with the Michigan Panthers in 2024

Montreal Alouettes
- Position: Running back
- Roster status: Active
- CFL status: American

Personal information
- Born: April 9, 1999 (age 27); Muskegon, Michigan, U.S.
- Listed height: 6 ft 0 in (1.83 m)
- Listed weight: 213 lb (97 kg)

Career information
- High school: Reeths-Puffer (Muskegon, Michigan)
- College: Saginaw Valley State (2017–2020)
- NFL draft: 2021: undrafted

Career history
- Baltimore Ravens (2021)*; Denver Broncos (2021); Baltimore Ravens (2021); Carolina Panthers (2022)*; Cleveland Browns (2023)*; Green Bay Packers (2023)*; Cleveland Browns (2023)*; Michigan Panthers (2024); Green Bay Packers (2024)*; Michigan Panthers (2025); Houston Gamblers (2026)*; Montreal Alouettes (2026–present)
- * Offseason or practice squad member only

Career NFL statistics as of 2025
- Rushing yards: -1
- Stats at Pro Football Reference

Nate McCrary (born April 9, 1999) is an American former professional football running back for the Montreal Alouettes of the Canadian Football League (CFL). He played college football at Saginaw Valley State.

== College career ==
McCrary played for Saginaw Valley State, where, in 33 games, he rushed the ball 377 times for 1,889 yards and 28 touchdowns and in his junior and final season, he set career highs with 1,060 yards and 6.3 yards per carry and was named to the All-GLIAC First-team. He ranks fourth on the SVSU career rushing touchdowns all-time list.

== Professional career ==
Pre-draft measurables
Height	Weight	Arm length	Hand span	40-yard dash	10-yard split	20-yard split	20-yard shuttle	Three-cone drill	Vertical jump	Broad jump	Bench press
6 ft 0 1/4 in (1.84 m)	213 lb (97 kg)	30 in (0.76 m)	9 1/4 in (0.23 m)	4.52 s	1.50 s	2.72 s	4.19 s	6.94 s	34.0 in (0.86 m)	10 ft 3 in (3.12 m)	19 reps
All values from Pro Day

=== Baltimore Ravens (first stint) ===
On May 1, 2021, McCrary was signed by the Baltimore Ravens as an undrafted free agent and was the Ravens' leading rusher in the preseason, carrying the ball 42 times for 163 yards and a touchdown. However, on August 31, 2021, he was waived by the Ravens.

=== Denver Broncos ===
On September 1, 2021, McCrary was claimed off waivers by the Denver Broncos. He was released on September 23, 2021.

=== Baltimore Ravens (second stint) ===
On September 25, 2021, McCrary was signed to the Ravens practice squad. On January 18, 2022, McCrary signed a reserve/future contract with the Ravens.

On August 30, 2022, McCrary was waived by the Ravens.

=== Carolina Panthers ===
On November 1, 2022, McCrary was signed to the Carolina Panthers practice squad. He was released on December 13.

=== Cleveland Browns (first stint) ===
On January 11, 2023, McCrary signed a reserve/future contract with the Cleveland Browns. He was waived on August 4, 2023.

=== Green Bay Packers (first stint) ===
On August 7, 2023, McCrary signed with the Green Bay Packers. He was released on August 29, 2023.

=== Cleveland Browns (second stint) ===
On October 25, 2023, the Browns signed McCrary to their practice squad. McCrary was released on October 31.

=== Michigan Panthers (first stint) ===
On December 8, 2023, McCrary signed with the Michigan Panthers of the United States Football League (USFL). His contract was terminated on August 13, 2024, to sign with an NFL team.

=== Green Bay Packers (second stint) ===
On August 14, 2024, McCrary signed with the Green Bay Packers. He was released on August 27, 2024, and re-signed to the practice squad. He was placed on practice squad/injured reserve two days later, and released shortly after.

=== Michigan Panthers (second stint) ===
On October 3, 2024, McCrary re-signed with the Michigan Panthers.

=== Houston Gamblers ===
On January 13, 2026, McCrary was selected by the Houston Gamblers in the 2026 UFL Draft. He was released on March 6.

=== Montreal Alouettes ===
On September 23, 2026, McCray signed a futures contract with the Montreal Alouettes of the Canadian Football League (CFL).

== NFL career statistics ==
Legend
	Led the league
**Bold**	Career high

Regular season statistics
Year	Team	Games		Rushing					Receiving					Fumbles	
Year	Team	GP	GS	Att	Yds	Avg	Lng	TD	Rec	Yds	Avg	Lng	TD	Fum	Lost
2021	BAL	1	0	1	−1	-1.0	0	0	0	0	0.0	0	0	0	0
Career		1	0	1	−1	-1.0	0	0	0	0	0.0	0	0	0	0
