= South Fort Myers High School =

Public high school in Fort Myers, Florida, United States

Location
- 14020 Plantation Road; Fort Myers, Florida; United States; 26.5374°N 81.8490°W

Information
- Type: Public
- Motto: "The strength of the wolf is the pack, and the strength of the pack is the wolf."
- Established: 2005
- School district: Lee County School District
- Principal: Vincent Lewis
- Staff: 82.75 (FTE)
- Faculty: 82.75 (on FTE basis)
- Grades: 9-12
- Enrollment: 1,738 (2023-2024)
- Student to teacher ratio: 21.00
- Colors: Black, red and white
- Mascot: Wolfie
- Nickname: SFMHS
- Team name: Wolf Pack
- Website: sfm.leeschools.net

South Fort Myers High School is a high school in Southern Fort Myers, Florida that is part of the Lee County School District.

== History ==
South Fort Myers High School was established in 2005, partially built on condemned land bought the year prior. Reportedly, its first employee was Grant Redhead, a former offensive coordinator at Cypress Lake High School brought on as the school's head football coach.

In 2009, it became the first school in Lee County to have its automotive academy certified by the National Institute for Automotive Service Excellence.

=== Sex scandal ===
On May 17, 2016, a 15-year-old female student had sex with several male students in one of the school's bathrooms. According to a statement the girl made to administrators, she had been a past victim of human trafficking and only reluctantly went along with it after being pressured by the men. Video of the events was filmed by some of those involved, which was then posted to Snapchat and spread across the school.

After the incident, five students were suspended and a football player named William Scott was arrested and charged.

== Athletics ==
The school's athletic department operates sixteen sports teams: baseball, basketball (boys and girls), bowling, cheerleading, cross country, football, golf, soccer (boys and girls), softball, swimming, tennis, track and field, volleyball, and wrestling.

== Dual enrollment ==
Students have the opportunity to take advantage of taking credit–granting college classes at Florida SouthWestern State College, Florida Gulf Coast University, and University of Florida.

== Academies ==
- Medical
- Public Service
- Construction
- Digital Design
- Manufacturing and Engineering Technology
- Business and Informational Technology.
- TV Production
- Agriscience
- Veterinary
- Criminal Justice
- Military Science/Leadership (JROTC)
- Automotive
- Welding

== Notable alumni ==
- Sammy Watkins - Wide Receiver for Green Bay Packers.
- Jayron Kearse - Safety for Dallas Cowboys.
- Jeshaun Jones - Wide Receiver for Minnesota Vikings
