= Jayron Kearse =

American football player (born 1994)

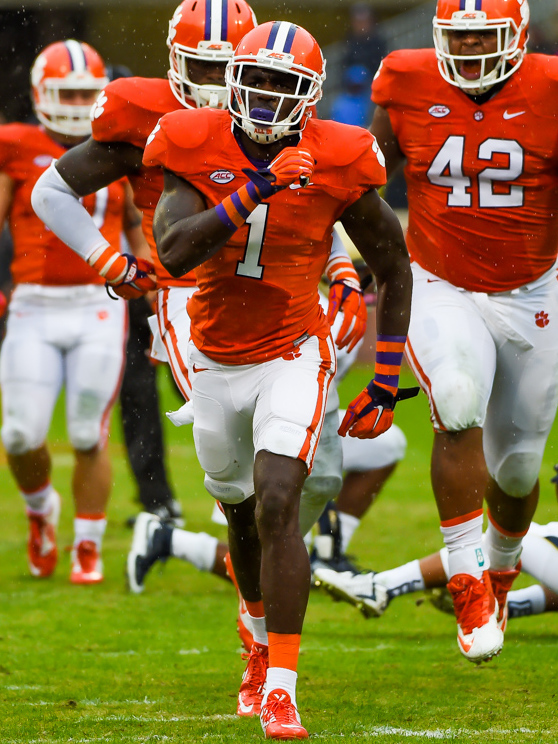
- Kearse (1) with the Clemson Tigers in 2015

Profile
- Position: Safety

Personal information
- Born: February 11, 1994 (age 32); Fort Myers, Florida, U.S.
- Listed height: 6 ft 4 in (1.93 m)
- Listed weight: 215 lb (98 kg)

Career information
- High school: South Fort Myers
- College: Clemson (2013–2015)
- NFL draft: 2016: 7th round, 244th overall pick

Career history
- Minnesota Vikings (2016–2019); Detroit Lions (2020); Baltimore Ravens (2020)*; Dallas Cowboys (2021–2023)
- * Offseason or practice squad member only

Awards and highlights
- First-team All-American (2015); First-team All-ACC (2015)

Career NFL statistics
- Total tackles: 388
- Sacks: 5.0
- Forced fumbles: 2
- Fumble recoveries: 4
- Pass deflections: 29
- Interceptions: 5
- Stats at Pro Football Reference

Jayron Kearse (born February 11, 1994) is an American former professional football player who was a safety in the National Football League (NFL). He played college football for the Clemson Tigers and was selected by the Minnesota Vikings in the seventh round of the 2016 NFL draft.

== Early life ==
A native of Fort Myers, Florida, he attended Cypress Lake High School. As a freshman, he initially measured 5-foot-8 and played safety on defense, before experiencing a growth spurt. As a sophomore, he was named the starting quarterback on a team that ran a Wing T offense, posting 1,049 rushing yards, 13 rushing touchdowns and 5 passing touchdowns. As a junior running quarterback, he rushed for 1,600 yards and 17 touchdowns, to go along with 2 interceptions on defense.

As a senior in 2012, he transferred to South Fort Myers High School. He played as a safety, running back and wide receiver, helping lead his team to an 11–2 record, after rushing for 528 yards (12.3 yards per carry) and five touchdowns, to go along with five more receiving scores while averaging 18.9 yards per reception; as a safety on defense, he tallied 87 tackles, three sacks and three interception(one for a touchdown). Following his senior season, he was invited to play in the Offense-Defense All-American Bowl in Houston, Texas. Kearse also participated in track & field for the Wolfpack.

Frequently listed as an "athlete" by most recruiting services, Kearse was rated as a four-star recruit by Rivals.com, as well as the No. 16 athlete in the nation according to both Rivals and 247Sports.com. He was viewed as the seventh best outside linebacker in the class of 2012 by Scout.com, while MaxPreps listed him as the fifteenth best athlete in the nation and considered him a four-star recruit.

Kearse originally committed to play college football at Auburn University in August 2011, but in January 2012, he verbally committed to the University of Miami after the Tigers lost coach Gus Malzahn to Arkansas State. He posted a picture of himself on his Twitter feed holding a Miami helmet and wearing a Hurricanes sweatshirt standing next to Hurricanes coach Al Golden. However, after attending camp at Clemson in June, he de-committed from the Hurricanes and ended up committing to Clemson University on August 2, 2012. Kearse stated: "I chose Clemson because the coaches are genuine people that care about their athletes, and is just a great place to be with a group of guys who all want the best for you."

College recruiting
Name	Hometown	School	Height	Weight	40^{‡}	Commit date
Jayron Kearse; ATH	Fort Myers, Florida	South Fort Myers (FL)	6 ft 4 in (1.93 m)	195 lb (88 kg)	4.45	Aug 2, 2012
Jayron Kearse; ATH	Recruit ratings: Scout: Rivals:					
Overall recruit ranking: Scout: 6 (OLB); 100 (national) Rivals: 14 (ATH); 40 (FL); 242 (national)
‡ Refers to 40-yard dash; Note: In many cases, Scout, Rivals, 247Sports, On3, and ESPN may conflict in their listings of height, weight and 40 time.; In these cases, the average was taken. ESPN grades are on a 100-point scale.; Sources: "2013 Clemson Football Commitment List". Rivals.; "2013 Clemson College Football Team Recruiting Prospects". Scout.; "Scout.com Team Recruiting Rankings". Scout.; "2013 Team Ranking". Rivals.com.

== College career ==
Kearse accepted a football scholarship from Clemson University, where he focused on playing strong safety under head coach Dabo Swinney from 2013 to 2015. He amassed 164 total tackles (11.5 tackles for loss), seven interceptions, 11 pass breakups, two forced fumbles and two recovered fumbles in 1,998 snaps over 40 games with 29 starts in his career.

=== Freshman season ===
Two weeks before his freshman season began, Kearse was a candidate to play nickelback in Clemson's five-defensive back formations, but a shoulder injury caused him to miss the end of fall camp and the opener against the University of Georgia, so fellow freshman strong safety Korrin Wiggins moved to nickel and Kearse settled in as Travis Blanks’ backup. In the following three games of the season, Kearse logged some spare playing time in home blowouts over South Carolina State in week 2 and Wake Forest in week 4 until he was thrust into 75 snaps during Clemson's 49–14 win over the Syracuse Orange in week 5, recording eight tackles and his first career interception.

The following week, he started against Boston College and contributed with 4 tackles. However, in week 7, Kearse played just three snaps against Florida State. In the next two weeks, at Maryland and Virginia, a knee injury to Blanks gave Kearse more playing time and he recorded 2 interceptions.

In the season finale against South Carolina, he played all 81 snaps and had 10 tackles. In the 2014 Orange Bowl 40–35 win against Ohio State, he had 9 tackles and one key interception.

As a true freshman, he played in 12 games with three starts, compiling 55 tackles (0.5 for loss), a career-high four interceptions (led the team) and one forced fumble.

=== Sophomore season ===
As a sophomore in 2014, he became a full time starter at strong safety (12 out of 13 starts). He recorded 67 tackles (5 for loss), two interceptions, 7 pass breakups, three sacks and one fumble recovery.

Against the #1 ranked Florida State University, he had 4 tackles and one interception. He had 4 tackles and one fumble recovery in the 2014 Russell Athletic Bowl against Oklahoma University.

=== Junior season ===
As a junior in 2015, he used his uncommon size for a safety to provide a physical presence in the Clemson secondary. He registered 87 tackles (6.5 for loss), one interception, 8 passes defensed, one forced fumble and one fumble recovery. He received second-team All-American honors from the Associated Press.

Against Georgia Tech, he shared player of the game honors after setting a career-high 3 tackles for loss. He made 10 tackles in the 2015 Orange Bowl against Oklahoma University. He tallied 3 tackles in the National Championship Game loss against the University of Alabama

After the 2016 national championship game, Kearse announced that he would forgo his senior season and enter the NFL draft, with many mock drafts projecting him as a late 1st round selection.

== Professional career ==
Pre-draft measurables
Height	Weight	Arm length	Hand span	Wingspan	40-yard dash	10-yard split	20-yard split	20-yard shuttle	Three-cone drill	Vertical jump	Broad jump	Bench press
6 ft 4 in (1.93 m)	216 lb (98 kg)	34 1/4 in (0.87 m)	9 5/8 in (0.24 m)	6 ft 9 7/8 in (2.08 m)	4.62 s	1.63 s	2.69 s	4.60 s	7.06 s	31.5 in (0.80 m)	10 ft 4 in (3.15 m)	16 reps
All values from NFL Combine, except 20-yard shuttle result from Clemson's Pro Day

=== Minnesota Vikings ===
==== 2016 season ====
Kearse was selected by the Minnesota Vikings in the seventh round (244th overall) of the 2016 NFL draft, dropping after posting a 4.62 time in the 40-yard dash and being criticized for taking bad tackling angles. He mentioned in the media that he watched hopelessly as he was passed on by NFL teams round after round. "I threw the caps on the ground after I was selected." Kearse said. "The Vikings gave me a shot. 31 passed on me, so 31 got thrown on the ground. The Vikings are the lucky ones. I'm definitely going to make the other 31 pay.”

As a rookie, he was one of the three tallest safeties in the league at 6-foot-4 and joined his former college teammate, cornerback Mackensie Alexander, who was taken by the Vikings in the second round.

Kearse saw his first significant action of the 2016 season in Week 7 against the Philadelphia Eagles, playing 52 of 58 snaps on defense and recording two tackles after starter Andrew Sendejo went down with an ankle injury after intercepting a pass. He made his first career start the following week against the Chicago Bears. Overall in 2016, Kearse appeared in all 16 games with one start, collecting 6 defensive tackles and 6 special teams tackles (tied for sixth on the team).

==== 2017 season ====
In 2017, Kearse played mostly on special teams. He appeared in 15 regular season games and 2 playoff contests. He tallied 13 defensive tackles (one for loss) and 14 special teams tackles (fourth on the team). His first career tackle-for-loss came against the Cincinnati Bengals in Week 15.

==== 2018 season ====
In 2018, he appeared in 16 games with one start. He played mostly as a slot cornerback in the team's "big nickel" package. He made his first career pass breakup against the Los Angeles Rams in Week 4. He had a career game in Week 7 against the New York Jets, recording five tackles (one for loss), a half sack, and one quarterback hit. He followed this up the next week against New Orleans Saints, collecting five tackles for a second week in a row. Overall in 2018, Kearse posted 32 tackles (one for loss), a half sack, 2 quarterback hurries, 2 pass breakups and 18 special teams tackles (which led the team).

==== 2019 season ====
In 2019, he appeared in 15 games with 3 starts at free safety. He also played in one playoff contest. In Week 1 against the Atlanta Falcons, he had a career-high nine tackles and one pass breakup. He made his first career interception in Week 10 against the Dallas Cowboys, when he caught a last-second Hail Mary pass attempt to close out a 28–24 win. In Week 11 against the Denver Broncos, he prevented a potential game-winning touchdown, covering rookie tight end Noah Fant on two consecutive pass attempts in the end zone, helping to seal a 27–23 comeback victory. He registered 28 tackles, one quarterback hurry, 6 pass breakups and one special teams tackle during the season.

During his time with the Vikings, Kearse appeared in 62 games with five starts (only missed two games), while making 62 tackles, one interception, eight pass breakups, and 39 special teams tackles.

=== Detroit Lions ===
On March 27, 2020, Kearse signed a one-year, $2.75 million contract with the Detroit Lions. On July 31, 2020, he was suspended for the first three games of the 2020 season for violating the NFL's substance-abuse policy. He was reinstated from suspension and activated on October 1, 2020. In Week 9, against his former team the Vikings, Kearse was named the full-time starter at strong safety. He tied his career-high of nine tackles in Week 10 against Washington Football Team.

Kearse was inactive for the Week 16 game against the Tampa Bay Buccaneers, after reportedly leaving the hotel room without permission and being late to a bed check on a road trip, which violated the team rules. On December 28, 2020, he was waived by the Lions before the season finale.

With Detroit, Kearse appeared in 11 games with 7 starts, posting 59 tackles, one quarterback hit, 2 pass breakups, one forced fumble, and 3 special teams tackles.

=== Baltimore Ravens ===
On December 31, 2020, Kearse was signed to the practice squad of the Baltimore Ravens. His practice squad contract with the team expired after the season on January 25, 2021.

=== Dallas Cowboys ===
==== 2021 season ====
Kearse signed as a free agent with the Dallas Cowboys on March 30, 2021. He reunited with senior defensive assistant George Edwards, who was his defensive coordinator with the Minnesota Vikings.

Kearse was expected to be a special teams player, but surprised observers by being named the Cowboys starting strong safety (15 starts), while recording 92 tackles (led the team), 7 tackles for loss (second on the team), 2 interceptions and 10 pass breakups, all career-highs.

He had 9 tackles against the Tampa Bay Buccaneers. He made 9 tackles and one pass breakup against the Denver Broncos. He had 9 tackles (one for loss) and 2 pass breakups against Las Vegas Raiders. He missed the season finale against the Philadelphia Eagles after being placed on the COVID-19 list. He started his first career playoff game, finishing the Wild Card game against the San Francisco 49ers with 10 tackles and one pass breakup.

==== 2022 season ====
On March 21, 2022, Kearse signed a two-year, $10 million contract extension with the Cowboys. He started 14 games, registering 83 tackles (third on the team), 5 tackles for loss, 2 sacks, one interception, 5 pass breakups and 2 fumble recoveries. He sprained his left MCL in the season opener against the Tampa Bay Buccaneers and was forced to play on a bad knee in most of the games. He missed 3 contests with a knee injury. He suffered a right labrum tear on the Thanksgiving game against the New York Giants, that forced him to play with a harness and have offseason surgery.

He had 7 tackles against the Tampa Bay Buccaneers before leaving the game with a knee injury. He made nine tackles (one for loss), one sack and 2 quarterback pressures against the Chicago Bears. He had 8 tackles (2 for loss), one quarterback pressure and one pass breakup against the Indianapolis Colts. He made 7 tackles (one tackle for loss), one pass breakup and one forced fumble. In the 2022 NFC Wild Card Game on January 16, 2023, Kearse recorded an interception against Tampa Bay Buccaneers quarterback Tom Brady during the second quarter of the Dallas Cowboys’ 31–14 road victory at Raymond James Stadium. The interception marked the final interception thrown in Brady’s NFL career, as he announced his retirement shortly after the season. Kearse also finished the game with three pass deflections as part of a strong defensive performance by the Cowboys, who limited Tampa Bay to 14 points and advanced to the Divisional Round.

==== 2023 season ====
In 2023, he appeared in 16 games with 13 starts, collecting 72 tackles (tied for fourth on the team), 1.5 sacks, 4 tackles for loss, 5 quarterback pressures and 4 pass breakups. He missed the tenth game against the Washington Commanders with an injury. He was not re-signed after the season.

== Career statistics ==
=== NFL ===
Year	Team	Games		Tackles					Interceptions						Fumbles		
Year	Team	GP	GS	Comb	Solo	Ast	Sck	Sfty	PDef	Int	Yds	Avg	Lng	TDs	FF	FR	YDs
2016	MIN	16	1	6	4	2	0.0	0	0	0	0	0.0	0	0	0	1	0
2017	MIN	15	0	13	9	4	0.0	0	0	0	0	0.0	0	0	0	0	0
2018	MIN	16	1	32	27	5	0.5	0	2	0	0	0.0	0	0	0	0	0
2019	MIN	15	3	28	19	9	0.0	0	6	1	0	0.0	0	0	0	0	0
2020	DET	11	7	59	41	18	0.0	0	2	0	0	0.0	0	0	1	0	0
2021	DAL	16	15	101	67	34	2.0	0	10	2	34	17.0	34	0	0	1	1
2022	DAL	14	14	77	55	22	1.0	0	5	1	2	2.0	2	0	1	2	6
2023	DAL	10	8	47	30	17	1.5	0	3	1	32	32.0	32	0	0	0	0
Total		113	49	363	252	111	0.0	0	28	5	68	17.0	34	0	2	4	7

=== College ===
Season	Team	GP	GS	Tackles					Interceptions						Fumbles		
Season	Team	GP	GS	Total	Solo	Ast	Sck	Tfl	PDef	Int	Yds	Avg	Lng	TDs	FF	FR	FR YDS
2013	Clemson	12	3	41	29	12	0.0	0.0	0	4	62	15.5	0	0	1	0	0
2014	Clemson	13	13	61	46	15	3.0	5.0	5	2	21	10.5	0	0	0	1	0
2015	Clemson	14	14	62	41	21	0.0	6.5	6	1	0	0.0	0	0	1	1	0
Totals		39	30	164	116	48	3.0	11.5	11	7	83	11.9	0	0	2	2	0

== Personal life ==
Kearse has family ties to the NFL, as Jevon Kearse, former Florida Gators All-American and longtime Tennessee Titans defensive end is his uncle, and his cousin, Phillip Buchanon, played college football for the Miami Hurricanes and was taken in the first round of the 2002 NFL draft by the Oakland Raiders. At the age of 14, Kearse was out of football and in the summer of 2008 got arrested on a felony charge of robbery with another minor in Fort Myers, Florida, according to WBBH-TV. Kearse called that a “turning point” in his life.

On October 27, 2019, Kearse was stopped by a Minnesota State Patrol Trooper for driving around a construction barricade onto the closed portion of U.S. Interstate 94 at Cedar Avenue in Minneapolis, Minnesota. He was placed under arrest on suspicion of driving while intoxicated (DWI) and had a blood alcohol content of .10. During a search of Kearse's vehicle, the trooper found a loaded firearm for which Kearse did not have a permit. He was arrested on fourth-degree DWI and possession of a firearm without a permit. He pleaded guilty on February 27, 2020, to the charges and was sentenced to probation and community service.
