= Patrick Mekari =

American football player (born 1997)

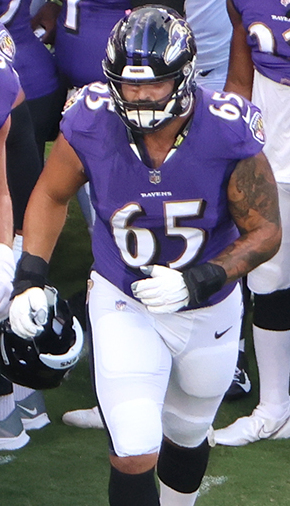
- Mekari with the Baltimore Ravens in 2022

No. 65 – Jacksonville Jaguars
- Position: Guard
- Roster status: Injured reserve

Personal information
- Born: August 13, 1997 (age 29); Westlake Village, California, U.S.
- Listed height: 6 ft 4 in (1.93 m)
- Listed weight: 305 lb (138 kg)

Career information
- High school: Westlake
- College: California (2015–2018)
- NFL draft: 2019: undrafted

Career history
- Baltimore Ravens (2019–2024); Jacksonville Jaguars (2025–present)

Career NFL statistics as of 2025
- Games played: 102
- Games started: 67
- Fumble recoveries: 1
- Stats at Pro Football Reference

Patrick Mekari (born August 13, 1997) is an American professional football guard for the Jacksonville Jaguars of the National Football League (NFL). He played college football for the California Golden Bears.

== Professional career ==
Pre-draft measurables
Height	Weight	Arm length	Hand span	Wingspan	40-yard dash	10-yard split	20-yard split	20-yard shuttle	Three-cone drill	Vertical jump	Broad jump	Bench press
6 ft 4 5/8 in (1.95 m)	308 lb (140 kg)	31 5/8 in (0.80 m)	9 7/8 in (0.25 m)	6 ft 6 1/8 in (1.98 m)	5.43 s	1.82 s	3.12 s	4.86 s	7.90 s	26.5 in (0.67 m)	7 ft 11 in (2.41 m)	23 reps
All values from Pro Day

=== Baltimore Ravens ===
The Baltimore Ravens signed Mekari as an undrafted free agent, as he was not selected in the 2019 NFL draft. After a strong camp and preseason while showing off his versatility, Mekari made the Ravens initial 53-man roster, extending the streak of undrafted players making the Ravens roster to 16 years.

After coming in to the game against the Los Angeles Rams in Week 12 in the 2019 season for an injured Matt Skura, Mekari made his first start at home against the San Francisco 49ers when Matt Skura was placed on season-ending injured reserve.

During the 2020 season, Mekari was placed on the reserve/COVID-19 list by the team on November 25, 2020, and activated on December 4, 2020.

The 2021 season saw Mekari become the Ravens' starting right tackle after injuries to starting left tackle Ronnie Stanley and starting left guard/backup right tackle Tyre Phillips in Week 1. Starting right tackle Alejandro Villanueva shifted to left tackle in place of Stanley, which opened the door for Mekari to be the starting right tackle the majority of the rest of the season.

On December 30, 2021, Mekari signed a three-year contract extension with the Ravens.

=== Jacksonville Jaguars ===
On March 12, 2025, Mekari signed with the Jacksonville Jaguars on a three-year, $37.5 million contract.

On August 30, 2026, Mekari was placed on injured reserve due to not being able to recover quickly from offseason back surgery.

=== NFL career statistics ===
Year	Team	Games	Starts
2019	BAL	11	5
2020	BAL	14	8
2021	BAL	13	12
2022	BAL	16	4
2023	BAL	15	7
2024	BAL	16	6
Career		87	52

== Personal life ==
He is the son of a Lebanese American father and Iranian American mother, who settled in California.
