= 2019 Baltimore Ravens season =

24th season in franchise history

- Owner: Steve Bisciotti
- General manager: Eric DeCosta
- Head coach: John Harbaugh
- Offensive coordinator: Greg Roman
- Defensive coordinator: Don Martindale
- Home stadium: M&T Bank Stadium

Results
- Record: 14–2
- Division place: 1st AFC North
- Playoffs: Lost Divisional Playoffs (vs. Titans) 12–28
- All-Pros: 6: QB Lamar Jackson (1st team); LT Ronnie Stanley (1st team); DB Marlon Humphrey (1st team); DB Marcus Peters (1st team); K Justin Tucker (1st team); RG Marshal Yanda (2nd team); CB Marcus Peters (2nd team)
- Pro Bowlers: 13: QB Lamar Jackson; RB Mark Ingram II; FB Patrick Ricard; TE Mark Andrews; T Ronnie Stanley; T Orlando Brown Jr.; G Marshal Yanda; OLB Matthew Judon; CB Marcus Peters; CB Marlon Humphrey; FS Earl Thomas; K Justin Tucker; LS Morgan Cox
- Team MVP: QB Lamar Jackson

Uniform
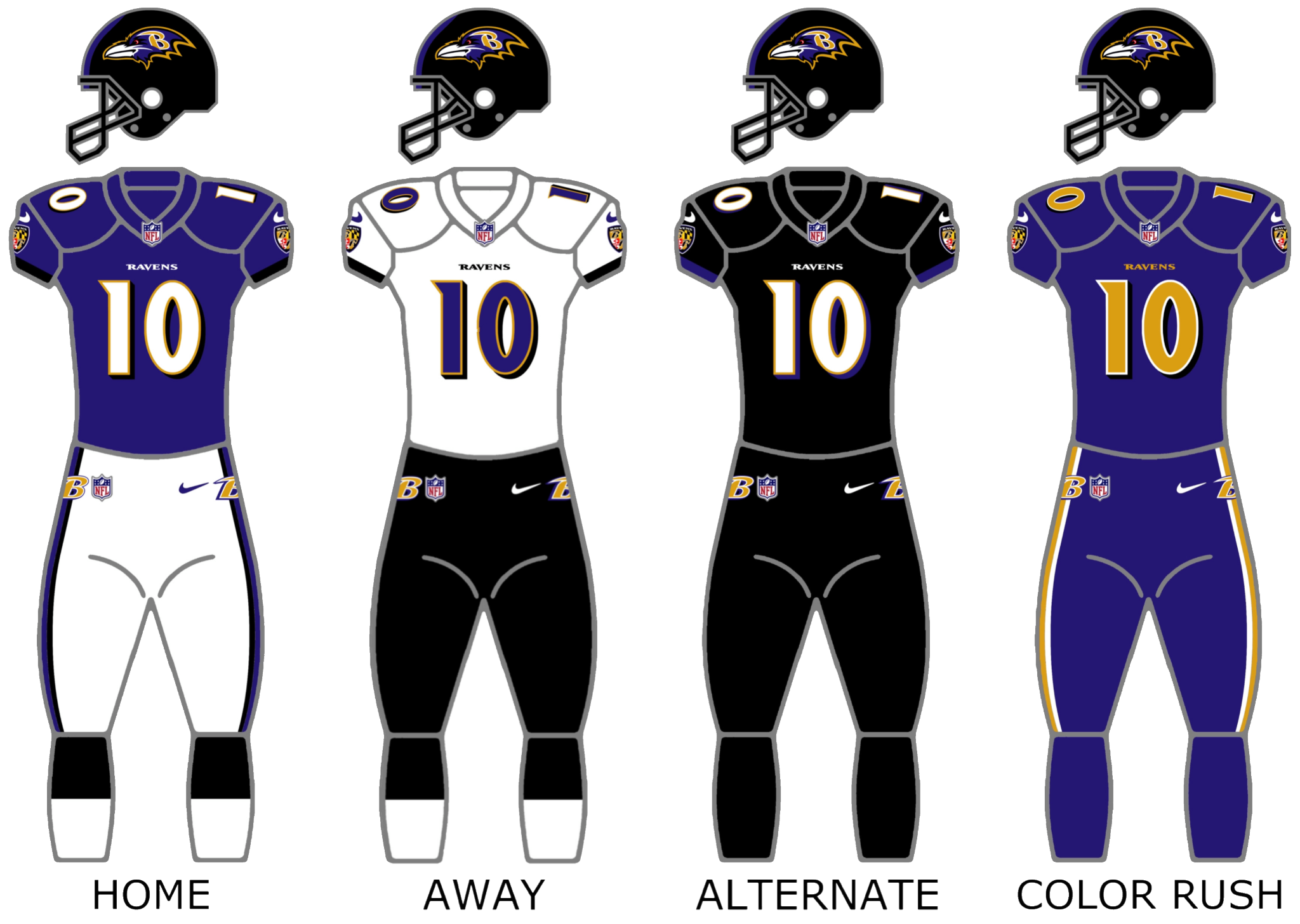

The 2019 season was the Baltimore Ravens' 24th season in the National Football League (NFL) and their 12th under head coach John Harbaugh. This was the team's first season under general manager Eric DeCosta following the retirement of Ozzie Newsome.

This season also marked the first year in which Terrell Suggs and Joe Flacco were not on the Ravens roster since 2002 and 2007, respectively, as Suggs left to join the Arizona Cardinals (later released and signed by the eventual Super Bowl champion Kansas City Chiefs) and Flacco was traded to the Denver Broncos.

The Ravens started the season as the only NFL team with three former Heisman Trophy winners on their roster: Lamar Jackson, Mark Ingram II, and Robert Griffin III. The Ravens were also the only NFL team to score at least 20 points in each of their games during the season. and the only team to score on more than half of their drives. By Week 13, the Ravens improved to 10–2 for the first time in franchise history and extended their winning streak to eight games, also a franchise (regular season) record. After a win against the Buffalo Bills, the Ravens won their ninth consecutive game and improved on their 10–6 record from 2018. That win also clinched a second straight playoff berth for the team. Quarterback Lamar Jackson became only the second quarterback in NFL history to run for over 1,000 yards, and the following week, he broke Michael Vick's all-time single season quarterback rushing record during the game against the New York Jets.

By Week 15, the Ravens had scored more points (430) in a single season than any other team in franchise history. In Week 15, they clinched their second straight AFC North title with a 42–21 victory over the Jets.

On December 17, the NFL announced the rosters of the 2020 Pro Bowl which included 12 Ravens, the most of any team in 2019. On January 15, 2020, Orlando Brown Jr. was added to the Pro Bowl roster, which tied the 2007 Dallas Cowboys for the NFL record for most Pro Bowlers in a single season at 13. With a Week 16 win over the Cleveland Browns, the Ravens clinched the AFC #1 seed, gaining home-field advantage throughout the AFC playoffs, and broke 500 total points, both for the first time in franchise history. The 28–10 Week 17 victory over the Pittsburgh Steelers gave the Ravens their best record in franchise history, surpassing 2006. The Ravens finished the regular season with 3,296 rushing yards, the second most by any team in NFL history during a season behind only the 1948 San Francisco 49ers of the AAFC. The Ravens became the first team in NFL history to average at least 200 passing yards and 200 rushing yards per game in the same season. The Ravens outscored their opponents by 249 points, the highest point differential in the NFL in 2019. On January 3, 2020, the Associated Press released its picks for the 2019 All-Pro Team. QB Lamar Jackson, OT Ronnie Stanley, CB Marlon Humphrey, CB Marcus Peters, and K Justin Tucker were named to the first team and G Marshal Yanda was named to the second team. The five Ravens selected to the first team were the most of any NFL team.

With their high-powered offense in the regular season, the Ravens entered the playoffs as the favorites to win Super Bowl LIV. However, they were instead beaten in a shocking upset by the Tennessee Titans in the Divisional Round by a final score of 28–12.

The 2019 Ravens are widely considered one of the greatest teams to not make the Super Bowl.

== Draft ==
External videos
- Ravens draft Marquise Brown Ravens video
- Ravens draft Jaylon Ferguson NFL video
- Ravens draft Miles Boykin NFL video
- Ravens draft Justice Hill NFL video
- Ravens draft Ben Powers Ravens video
- Ravens draft Iman Marshall Ravens video
- Ravens draft Daylon Mack Ravens video
- Ravens draft Trace McSorley Ravens video

2019 Baltimore Ravens draft
Round	Pick	Player	Position	College	Notes
1	25	Marquise Brown	WR	Oklahoma	from Philadelphia
3	85	Jaylon Ferguson	OLB	Louisiana Tech	
3	93	Miles Boykin	WR	Notre Dame	
4	113	Justice Hill	RB	Oklahoma State	from Denver
4	123	Ben Powers	G	Oklahoma	
4	127	Iman Marshall	CB	USC	
5	160	Daylon Mack	DT	Texas A&M	
6	197	Trace McSorley	QB	Penn State	
Made roster † Pro Football Hall of Fame * Made at least one Pro Bowl during career

=== Undrafted free agents ===
2019 Baltimore Ravens Undrafted Free Agents
Player	Position	College	Notes
Juston Christian	WR	Marist	
Sean Modster	WR	Boise State	
Jaylen Smith	WR	Louisville	
Antoine Wesley	WR	Texas Tech	
Cole Merdman	TE	Purdue	
Charles Scarff	TE	Delaware	
Marcus Applefield	OT	Virginia	
Patrick Mekari	OT	California	
C.J. Toogood	G	Elon	
Kalil Morris	DT	Kent State	
Gerald Willis	DE	Miami (FL)	
Markus Jones	OLB	Angelo State	
Michael Onuoha	OLB	Texas A&M–Commerce	
Otaro Alaka	ILB	Texas A&M	
Ejodamen Ejiya	ILB	North Texas	
Silas Stewart	ILB	Incarnate Word	
Tank Kelly	CB	Fresno State	
Matthew Orzech	LS	Azusa Pacific	

Notes

- The Ravens traded their second-round selection (No. 53 overall), along with their 2018 second- and fourth-round selections to the Philadelphia Eagles in exchange for the Eagles' 2018 first- and fourth-round selections.
- The Ravens traded quarterback Joe Flacco to the Denver Broncos in exchange for the Broncos' fourth-round selection (No. 113 overall).
- The Ravens acquired an additional sixth-round selection in a trade that sent linebacker Kamalei Correa to the Tennessee Titans.
- The Ravens traded their seventh-round selection to the Jacksonville Jaguars in exchange for center Luke Bowanko.
- As the result of a negative differential of free agent signings and departures that the Ravens experienced during the 2018 free agency period, the team received one compensatory selection for the 2019 draft — a third-round selection (No. 102 overall) – to compensate for the loss of center Ryan Jensen.
- The Ravens traded their first-round selection (No. 22 overall) to the Philadelphia Eagles in exchange for the Eagles' 2019 first-, fourth-, and sixth-round selections
- The Ravens traded their third rounder (No. 102) and their first two sixes (191, 193) to the Minnesota Vikings for their third rounder (No. 93)

== Staff ==
2019 Baltimore Ravens staff
Front office: Owner – Steve Bisciotti; President – Dick Cass; Executive vice president/general manager – Eric DeCosta; Senior vice president of football administration – Pat Moriarty; Director of pro personnel – Vince Newsome; Director of college scouting – Joe Hortiz; Director of football administration – Nick Matteo; Director of compliance – Jessica Markison; Senior personnel assistant – George Kokinis; Head coaches: Head coach – John Harbaugh; Assistant head coach/passing coordinator/wide receivers – David Culley; Assistant to the head coach – Dan Parsons; Offensive coaches: Offensive coordinator – Greg Roman; Quarterbacks – James Urban; Running backs – Matt Weiss; Tight ends – Bobby Engram; Assistant tight ends – Andy Bischoff; Offensive line – Joe D'Alessandris; Assistant offensive line – Richard Angulo; Senior assistant/running backs – Craig Ver Steeg	Defensive coaches: Defensive coordinator – Don Martindale; Defensive line – Joe Cullen; Assistant defensive line/outside linebackers – Drew Wilkins; Linebackers – Mike Macdonald; Defensive backs – Chris Hewitt; Assistant defensive backs – Jesse Minter; Defensive quality control – Sterling Lucas; Special teams coaches: Special teams – Chris Horton; Assistant special teams – Randy Brown; Assistant special teams – T. J. Weist; Strength and conditioning: Head strength and conditioning – Steve Saunders; Assistant strength and conditioning – Anthony Watson

== Final roster ==
2019 Baltimore Ravens roster
Quarterbacks (QB): 3 Robert Griffin III; 8 Lamar Jackson; 7 Trace McSorley; Running backs (RB): 35 Gus Edwards; 43 Justice Hill; 21 Mark Ingram; 42 Patrick Ricard FB; Wide receivers (WR): 80 Miles Boykin; 15 Marquise Brown; 10 Chris Moore; 11 Seth Roberts; 12 Jaleel Scott; 83 Willie Snead; 16 De'Anthony Thomas; Tight ends (TE): 89 Mark Andrews; 86 Nick Boyle; 81 Hayden Hurst	Offensive linemen (OL): 77 Bradley Bozeman G; 78 Orlando Brown T; 70 Parker Ehinger G; 63 Hroniss Grasu C; 74 James Hurst T; 65 Patrick Mekari C; 72 Ben Powers G; 79 Ronnie Stanley T; 73 Marshal Yanda G; Defensive linemen (DL): 71 Justin Ellis NT; 96 Domata Peko DE; 97 Michael Pierce NT; 53 Jihad Ward DE; 98 Brandon Williams DE; 93 Chris Wormley DE	Linebackers (LB): 49 Chris Board ILB; 54 Tyus Bowser OLB; 57 Josh Bynes ILB; 45 Jaylon Ferguson OLB; 58 L. J. Fort ILB; 99 Matthew Judon OLB; 48 Patrick Onwuasor ILB; Defensive backs (DB): 34 Anthony Averett CB; 39 Brandon Carr CB; 36 Chuck Clark SS; 44 Marlon Humphrey CB; 41 Anthony Levine SS; 37 Iman Marshall CB; 24 Marcus Peters CB; 28 Jordan Richards FS; 22 Jimmy Smith CB; 29 Earl Thomas FS; 31 Brynden Trawick FS; Special teams (ST): 46 Morgan Cox LS; 4 Sam Koch P; 9 Justin Tucker K	Practice squad: 51 Aaron Adeoye OLB; 62 Marcus Applefield T (IR); 38 Terrell Bonds CB; 30 Christopher Ezeala FB (IPP); 66 Will Holden G; 92 Ufomba Kamalu DE; 47 Byron Marshall RB; 14 Sean Modster WR; 59 Michael Onuoha OLB; 61 R. J. Prince G; 40 Denzel Rice CB (IR); 85 Charles Scarff TE; 84 Antoine Wesley WR; Reserve: 50 Otaro Alaka ILB (IR); 60 Randin Crecilius G (IR); 32 DeShon Elliott FS (IR); 23 Tony Jefferson SS (IR); 94 Daylon Mack NT (IR); 90 Pernell McPhee OLB (IR); 68 Matt Skura C (IR); 46 Fish Smithson FS (IR); 25 Tavon Young CB (IR); Rookies in italics 53 active, 11 reserve, 11 practice squad

== Preseason ==
=== Schedule ===
Week	Date	Opponent	Result	Record	Venue	Recap
1	August 8	Jacksonville Jaguars	W 29–0	1–0	M&T Bank Stadium	Recap
2	August 15	Green Bay Packers	W 26–13	2–0	M&T Bank Stadium	Recap
3	August 22	at Philadelphia Eagles	W 26–15	3–0	Lincoln Financial Field	Recap
4	August 29	at Washington Redskins	W 20–7	4–0	FedEx Field	Recap

Note

- The Ravens' four preseason victories extended their preseason winning streak to 17 games.

== Regular season ==
=== Schedule ===
The Ravens alternated home and away games every game of the season, becoming just the fourth team to do so since the NFL season expanded to 16 games in 1978.

Week	Date	Opponent	Result	Record	Venue	Recap
1	September 8	at Miami Dolphins	W 59–10	1–0	Hard Rock Stadium	Recap
2	September 15	Arizona Cardinals	W 23–17	2–0	M&T Bank Stadium	Recap
3	September 22	at Kansas City Chiefs	L 28–33	2–1	Arrowhead Stadium	Recap
4	September 29	Cleveland Browns	L 25–40	2–2	M&T Bank Stadium	Recap
5	October 6	at Pittsburgh Steelers	W 26–23 (OT)	3–2	Heinz Field	Recap
6	October 13	Cincinnati Bengals	W 23–17	4–2	M&T Bank Stadium	Recap
7	October 20	at Seattle Seahawks	W 30–16	5–2	CenturyLink Field	Recap
8	Bye					
9	November 3	New England Patriots	W 37–20	6–2	M&T Bank Stadium	Recap
10	November 10	at Cincinnati Bengals	W 49–13	7–2	Paul Brown Stadium	Recap
11	November 17	Houston Texans	W 41–7	8–2	M&T Bank Stadium	Recap
12	November 25	at Los Angeles Rams	W 45–6	9–2	Los Angeles Memorial Coliseum	Recap
13	December 1	San Francisco 49ers	W 20–17	10–2	M&T Bank Stadium	Recap
14	December 8	at Buffalo Bills	W 24–17	11–2	New Era Field	Recap
15	December 12	New York Jets	W 42–21	12–2	M&T Bank Stadium	Recap
16	December 22	at Cleveland Browns	W 31–15	13–2	FirstEnergy Stadium	Recap
17	December 29	Pittsburgh Steelers	W 28–10	14–2	M&T Bank Stadium	Recap

=== Game summaries ===
==== Week 1: Baltimore Ravens 59, Miami Dolphins 10 ====
Week One: Baltimore Ravens at Miami Dolphins – Game summary

Quarter	1	2	3	4	Total
Ravens	21	21	10	7	59
Dolphins	0	10	0	0	10

at Hard Rock Stadium, Miami Gardens, Florida

- Date: September 8
- Game time: 1:00 p.m. EDT
- Game weather: Mostly cloudy, 91 °F (33 °C)
- Game attendance: 65,012
- Referee: Jerome Boger
- TV announcers (CBS): Andrew Catalon and James Lofton
- Recap, Game Book

Game information

First quarter

- BAL – Mark Ingram II 1-yard run (Justin Tucker kick), 10:34. Ravens 7–0. Drive: 8 plays, 89 yards, 4:26.
- BAL – Marquise Brown 47-yard pass from Lamar Jackson (Justin Tucker kick), 8:37. Ravens 14–0. Drive: 1 plays, 47 yards, 0:09.
- BAL – Marquise Brown 83-yard pass from Lamar Jackson (Justin Tucker kick), 4:17. Ravens 21–0. Drive: 3 plays, 90 yards, 1:29.

Second quarter

- BAL – Willie Snead IV 33-yard pass from Lamar Jackson (Justin Tucker kick), 13:49. Ravens 28–0. Drive: 7 plays, 80 yards, 3:23.
- MIA – Jason Sanders 54-yard field goal, 10:38. Ravens 28–3. Drive: 6 plays, 39 yards, 3:11.
- BAL – Miles Boykin 5-yard pass from Lamar Jackson (Justin Tucker kick), 6:50. Ravens 35–3. Drive: 3 plays, 10 yards, 1:34.
- BAL – Mark Ingram II 2-yard run (Justin Tucker kick), 1:42. Ravens 42–3. Drive: 7 plays, 79 yards, 2:37.
- MIA – Preston Williams 6-yard pass from Ryan Fitzpatrick (Jason Sanders kick), 0:13. Ravens 42–10. Drive: 8 plays, 75 yards, 1:29.

Third quarter

- BAL – Patrick Ricard 1-yard pass from Lamar Jackson (Justin Tucker kick), 7:54. Ravens 49–10. Drive: 9 plays, 71 yards, 5:08.
- BAL – Justin Tucker 34-yard field goal, 0:22. Ravens 52–10. Drive: 9 plays, 68 yards, 5:25.

Fourth quarter

- BAL – Mark Andrews 3-yard pass from Robert Griffin III (Justin Tucker kick), 9:24. Ravens 59–10. Drive: 9 plays, 42 yards, 5:30.

Top passers

- BAL – Lamar Jackson – 17/20, 324 yards, 5 TD
- MIA – Ryan Fitzpatrick – 14/29, 185 yards, TD, INT

Top rushers

- BAL – Mark Ingram II – 14 rushes, 107 yards, 2 TD
- MIA – Kenyan Drake – 4 rushes, 12 yards

Top receivers

- BAL – Marquise Brown – 4 receptions, 147 yards, 2 TD
- MIA – DeVante Parker – 3 receptions, 75 yards

The Ravens scored a franchise-high 42 points in the first half and Lamar Jackson threw five touchdown passes with no interceptions and became the youngest quarterback to achieve a perfect passer rating. All three of the Ravens' Heisman Trophy winners (Jackson, Mark Ingram II and Robert Griffin III) were involved in scoring plays.

The Dolphins gave up 49 yards on the first play from scrimmage and a total of 643 yards in the game, the most yards any Dolphins team has surrendered in a single game in franchise history. The 59 points were also the most surrendered by any Dolphins team in a regular season game. The 59–10 Ravens victory was also the largest margin of victory in Ravens history.

==== Week 2: Baltimore Ravens 23, Arizona Cardinals 17 ====
Week Two: Arizona Cardinals at Baltimore Ravens – Game summary

Quarter	1	2	3	4	Total
Cardinals	3	3	3	8	17
Ravens	7	10	0	6	23

at M&T Bank Stadium, Baltimore, Maryland

- Date: September 15
- Game time: 1:00 p.m. EDT
- Game weather: Sunny, 82 °F (28 °C)
- Game attendance: 70,126
- Referee: Ronald Torbert
- TV announcers (Fox): Brandon Gaudin, Cris Carter, and Peter Schrager
- Recap, Game Book

Game information

First quarter

- BAL – Mark Andrews 27-yard pass from Lamar Jackson (Justin Tucker kick), 8:06. Ravens 7–0. Drive: 7 plays, 94 yards, 3:56.
- ARI – Zane Gonzalez 22-yard field goal, 2:18. Ravens 7–3. Drive: 7 plays, 53 yards, 2:16.

Second quarter

- BAL – Justin Tucker 33-yard field goal, 14:07. Ravens 10–3. Drive: 9 plays, 60 yards, 3:11.
- ARI – Zane Gonzalez 22-yard field goal, 8:31. Ravens 10–6. Drive: 13 plays, 83 yards, 5:36.
- BAL – Hayden Hurst 1-yard pass from Lamar Jackson (Justin Tucker kick), 3:49. Ravens 17–6. Drive: 9 plays, 85 yards, 4:42

Third quarter

- ARI – Zane Gonzalez 21-yard field goal, 9:00. Ravens 17–9. Drive: 9 plays, 81 yards, 3:48.

Fourth quarter

- BAL – Justin Tucker 28-yard field goal, 14:56. Ravens 20–9. Drive: 16 plays, 70 yards, 9:04.
- ARI – David Johnson 1-yard run (Kyler Murray–Keesean Johnson pass), 12:52. Ravens 20–17. Drive: 4 plays, 79 yards, 2:04.
- BAL – Justin Tucker 51-yard field goal, 8:56 Ravens 23–17. Drive: 9 plays, 42 yards, 3:56.

Top passers

- ARI – Kyler Murray – 25/40, 349 yards
- BAL – Lamar Jackson – 24/37, 272 yards, 2 TD

Top rushers

- ARI – David Johnson – 7 rushes, 14 yards, TD
- BAL – Lamar Jackson – 16 rushes, 120 yards

Top receivers

- ARI – Christian Kirk – 6 receptions, 114 yards
- BAL – Mark Andrews – 8 receptions, 112 yards, TD

Lamar Jackson threw two touchdown passes, bringing him to seven through two games, setting a new franchise record for the most touchdown passes in the team's first two games of a season. Jackson also ran for a game high of 120 yards. Former Ravens' sack leader Terrell Suggs did not register a single sack against his former team.

The Cardinals were able to drive the ball within the Ravens' 5-yard line in each of the first three quarters, but the Ravens defense held them to a field goal each time.

==== Week 3: Kansas City Chiefs 33, Baltimore Ravens 28 ====
Week Three: Baltimore Ravens at Kansas City Chiefs – Game summary

Quarter	1	2	3	4	Total
Ravens	6	0	7	15	28
Chiefs	0	23	7	3	33

at Arrowhead Stadium, Kansas City, Missouri

- Date: September 22
- Game time: 1:00 p.m. EDT/12:00 p.m. CDT
- Game weather: Cloudy, 72 °F (22 °C)
- Game attendance: 73,390
- Referee: John Hussey
- TV announcers (CBS): Ian Eagle, Dan Fouts, and Evan Washburn
- Recap, Game Book

Game information

First quarter

- BAL – Mark Ingram II 2-yard run (run failed), 4:24. Ravens 6–0. Drive: 14 plays, 84 yards, 6:30.

Second quarter

- KC – LeSean McCoy 1-yard run (Harrison Butker kick), 14:18. Chiefs 7–6. Drive: 11 plays, 75 yards, 5:06.
- KC – Demarcus Robinson 18-yard pass from Patrick Mahomes (Harrison Butker kick), 7:52. Chiefs 14–6. Drive: 5 plays, 47 yards, 2:43.
- KC – Mecole Hardman 83-yard pass from Patrick Mahomes (kick failed, wide left), 3:00. Chiefs 20–6. Drive: 3 plays, 96 yards, 1:27.
- KC – Harrison Butker 42-yard field goal, 0:05. Chiefs 23–6. Drive: 9 plays, 59 yards, 1:13.

Third quarter

- BAL – Mark Ingram II 19-yard run (Justin Tucker kick), 10:35. Chiefs 23–13. Drive: 9 plays, 75 yards, 4:25.
- KC – LeSean McCoy 14-yard pass from Patrick Mahomes (Harrison Butker kick), 2:07. Chiefs 30–13. Drive: 8 plays, 80 yards, 4:14.

Fourth quarter

- BAL – Mark Ingram II 1-yard run (pass failed), 12:22. Chiefs 30–19. Drive: 13 plays, 75 yards, 4:45.
- BAL – Justin Tucker 39-yard field goal, 6:39. Chiefs 30–22. Drive: 10 plays, 59 yards, 4:01.
- KC – Harrison Butker 36-yard field goal, 4:36. Chiefs 33–22. Drive: 8 plays, 57 yards, 2:03.
- BAL – Lamar Jackson 9-yard run (pass failed), 2:01. Chiefs 33–28. Drive: 9 plays, 70 yards, 2:35.

Top passers

- BAL – Lamar Jackson – 22/43, 267 yards
- KC – Patrick Mahomes – 27/37, 374 yards, 3 TD

Top rushers

- BAL – Mark Ingram II – 16 rushes, 103 yards, 3 TD
- KC – Darrel Williams – 9 rushes, 62 yards

Top receivers

- BAL – Nick Boyle – 4 receptions, 58 yards
- KC – Mecole Hardman – 2 receptions, 97 yards, TD

The Ravens started the game strong with a 14-play, 84-yard touchdown drive that included a critical fourth down conversion. The Ravens attempt at a two-point conversion failed, so the Ravens led 6–0. The Chiefs responded on their next possession with an 11-play, 75-yard touchdown drive that was aided by a Pernell McPhee roughing the passer penalty. The Chiefs took the lead, 7–6. The Ravens offense sputtered as the Chiefs added two more touchdowns, the second of which included an 83-yard touchdown pass from Patrick Mahomes to Mecole Hardman. The Chiefs added a field goal and led 23–6 at the half.

The Ravens started the second half strong with an eight-play, 75-yard touchdown drive with all 75 yards gained on the ground. But the Chiefs responded with another touchdown. The Ravens then mounted a 13 play touchdown drive but failed for the second time in the game on a two-point conversion attempt, cutting the Chiefs' lead to 30–19. After the teams exchanged field goals, the Ravens scored on a nine-play, 70-yard drive that ended with a Lamar Jackson 9-yard touchdown run, but again, the two-point conversion failed and the Chiefs ran out the clock.

==== Week 4: Cleveland Browns 40, Baltimore Ravens 25 ====
Week Four: Cleveland Browns at Baltimore Ravens – Game summary

Quarter	1	2	3	4	Total
Browns	7	3	14	16	40
Ravens	0	7	3	15	25

at M&T Bank Stadium, Baltimore, Maryland

- Date: September 29
- Game time: 1:00 p.m. EDT
- Game weather: Partly cloudy, 83 °F (28 °C)
- Game attendance: 70,686
- Referee: Shawn Hochuli
- TV announcers (CBS): Greg Gumbel, Trent Green, and Melanie Collins
- Recap, Game Book

Game information

First quarter

- CLE – Ricky Seals-Jones 9-yard pass from Baker Mayfield (Austin Seibert kick), 2:50. Browns 7–0. Drive: 13 plays, 84 yards, 8:31.

Second quarter

- BAL – Miles Boykin 9-yard pass from Lamar Jackson (Justin Tucker kick), 1:55. Tied 7–7. Drive: 7 plays, 58 yards, 3:40.
- CLE – Austin Seibert 24-yard field goal, 0:08. Browns 10–7. Drive: 10 plays, 81 yards, 1:47.

Third quarter

- BAL – Justin Tucker 41-yard field goal, 11:15. Tied 10–10. Drive: 8 plays, 62 yards, 3:45.
- CLE – Nick Chubb 14-yard run (Austin Seibert kick), 9:41. Browns 17–10. Drive: 3 plays, 75 yards, 1:34.
- CLE – Nick Chubb 2-yard run (Austin Seibert kick), 0:53. Browns 24–10. Drive: 8 plays, 74 yards, 5:18.

Fourth quarter

- BAL – Mark Andrews 8-yard pass from Lamar Jackson (Mark Ingram II run), 9:51. Browns 24–18. Drive: 14 plays, 75 yards, 6:02.
- CLE – Nick Chubb 88-yard run (pass failed), 9:35. Browns 30–18. Drive: 1 play, 83 yards, 0:16.
- CLE – Austin Seibert 43-yard field goal, 6:56. Browns 33–18. Drive: 4 plays, 6 yards, 1:19.
- CLE – Dontrell Hilliard 1-yard run (Austin Seibert kick), 2:14. Browns 40–18. Drive: 6 plays, 39 yards, 3:07.
- BAL – Willie Snead IV 50-yard pass from Lamar Jackson (Justin Tucker kick), 0:30. Browns 40–25. Drive: 5 plays, 79 yards, 1:44.

Top passers

- CLE – Baker Mayfield – 20/30, 342 yards, TD, INT
- BAL – Lamar Jackson – 24/34, 247 yards, 3 TD, 2 INT

Top rushers

- CLE – Nick Chubb – 20 rushes, 165 yards, 3 TD
- BAL – Mark Ingram II – 12 rushes, 71 yards

Top receivers

- CLE – Jarvis Landry – 8 receptions, 167 yards
- BAL – Willie Snead – 2 receptions, 61 yards, TD

The Browns opened the scoring in the first quarter with a Baker Mayfield touchdown pass to Ricky Seals-Jones. However, the Ravens responded with a Lamar Jackson touchdown pass to Miles Boykin to tie the game at 7–7. An Austin Seibert field goal gave the Browns a 10–7 lead at halftime. In the second half, Nick Chubb had an 88-yard touchdown run to extend the Browns' lead just two plays after the Ravens had cut the score to 24–18. A Dontrell Hilliard touchdown run extended the Browns' lead to 40–18. The Ravens added a touchdown to make the final score 40–25.

==== Week 5: Baltimore Ravens 26, Pittsburgh Steelers 23 (OT) ====
Week Five: Baltimore Ravens at Pittsburgh Steelers – Game summary

Quarter	1	2	3	4	OT	Total
Ravens	10	7	0	6	3	26
Steelers	7	6	7	3	0	23

at Heinz Field, Pittsburgh, Pennsylvania

- Date: October 6
- Game time: 1:00 p.m. EDT
- Game weather: Rain, 70 °F (21 °C)
- Game attendance: 64,037
- Referee: Walt Anderson
- TV announcers (CBS): Ian Eagle, Dan Fouts, and Evan Washburn
- Recap, Game Book

Game information

First quarter

- BAL – Justin Tucker 27-yard field goal, 7:21. Ravens 3–0. Drive: 10 plays, 50 yards, 5:16.
- BAL – Mark Ingram II 4-yard run (Justin Tucker kick), 4:48. Ravens 10–0. Drive: 4 plays, 15 yards, 2:21.
- PIT – JuJu Smith-Schuster 35-yard pass from Mason Rudolph (Chris Boswell kick), 2:41. Ravens 10–7. Drive: 5 plays, 75 yards, 2:07.

Second quarter

- BAL – Marquise Brown 11-yard pass from Lamar Jackson (Justin Tucker kick), 11:21. Ravens 17–7. Drive: 13 plays, 75 yards, 6:20.
- PIT – Chris Boswell 41-yard field goal, 4:39. Ravens 17–10. Drive: 4 plays, −7 yards, 2:03.
- PIT – Chris Boswell 29-yard field goal, 0:00. Ravens 17–13. Drive: 3 plays, 14 yards, 0:33.

Third quarter

- PIT – James Conner 1-yard run (Chris Boswell kick), 3:42. Steelers 20–17. Drive: 10 plays, 87 yards, 4:40.

Fourth quarter

- BAL – Justin Tucker 26-yard field goal, 11:39. Tied 20–20. Drive: 12 plays, 67 yards, 7:03.
- PIT – Chris Boswell 33-yard field goal, 2:37. Steelers 23–20. Drive: 6 plays, 30 yards, 3:28.
- BAL – Justin Tucker 48-yard field goal, 0:10. Tied 23–23. Drive: 9 plays, 45 yards, 2:27.

Overtime

- BAL – Justin Tucker 46-yard field goal, 5:26. Ravens 26–23. Drive: 4 plays, 6 yards, 2:01.

Top passers

- BAL – Lamar Jackson – 19/28, 161 yards, TD, 3 INT
- PIT – Mason Rudolph – 13/20, 131 yards, TD

Top rushers

- BAL – Lamar Jackson – 14 rushes, 70 yards
- PIT – James Conner – 14 rushes, 55 yards, TD

Top receivers

- BAL – Willie Snead IV – 4 receptions, 51 yards
- PIT – JuJu Smith-Schuster – 7 receptions, 75 yards, TD

The Ravens' 12 game winning streak started in Pittsburgh. They went up 3–0 with a Justin Tucker 27-yard field goal, then made it 10–0 after a 4-yard touchdown by Mark Ingram II. The Steelers pulled it back to 10–7 after Mason Rudolph found JuJu Smith-Schuster for a 35-yard touchdown pass. In the second quarter, the Ravens increased their lead as Marquise Brown caught an 11-yard pass from Lamar Jackson. A pair of Chris Boswell field goals from 41 and 29 yards made it 17–13 going into halftime. In the third quarter, Steelers quarterback Mason Rudolph was knocked unconscious after being hit by Brandon Carr and Earl Thomas. With backup quarterback Devlin Hodges at the helm, the Steelers took the lead in the third quarter with a James Conner 1-yard touchdown. In the fourth quarter, the Ravens tied it up at 20 apiece with a Tucker 26-yard field goal. The Steelers retook the lead on a 33-yard Boswell field goal. The Ravens forced overtime when Tucker hit a 48-yard field goal with 10 seconds left in regulation. In overtime, after a fumble by Smith-Schuster, Tucker kicked the game-winning 46-yard field goal.

==== Week 6: Baltimore Ravens 23, Cincinnati Bengals 17 ====
Week Six: Cincinnati Bengals at Baltimore Ravens – Game summary

Quarter	1	2	3	4	Total
Bengals	7	3	0	7	17
Ravens	14	3	3	3	23

at M&T Bank Stadium, Baltimore, Maryland

- Date: October 13
- Game time: 1:00 p.m. EDT
- Game weather: Cloudy, 64 °F (18 °C)
- Game attendance: 70,051
- Referee: Clay Martin
- TV announcers (CBS): Kevin Harlan, Rich Gannon, and Jay Feely
- Recap, Game Book

Game information

First quarter

- CIN – Brandon Wilson 92-yard kickoff return (Randy Bullock kick), 14:48. Bengals 7–0. Drive: 0 plays, 0 yards, 0:12.
- BAL – Lamar Jackson 21-yard run (Justin Tucker kick), 11:28. Tied 7–7. Drive: 6 plays, 75 yards, 3:20.
- BAL – Mark Ingram II 1-yard run (Justin Tucker kick), 4:01. Ravens 14–7. Drive: 10 plays, 66 yards, 6:07.

Second quarter

- BAL – Justin Tucker 40-yard field goal, 14:48. Ravens 17–7. Drive: 8 plays, 57 yards, 3:02.
- CIN – Randy Bullock 22-yard field goal, 0:36. Ravens 17–10. Drive: 7 plays, 35 yards, 0:49.

Third quarter

- BAL – Justin Tucker 49-yard field goal, 0:02. Ravens 20–10. Drive: 13 plays, 60 yards, 6:58.

Fourth quarter

- BAL – Justin Tucker 21-yard field goal, 3:46. Ravens 23–10. Drive: 18 plays, 83 yards, 9:46.
- CIN – Andy Dalton 2-yard run (Randy Bullock kick), 1:28. Ravens 23–17. Drive: 12 plays, 75 yards, 2:18.

Top passers

- CIN – Andy Dalton – 21/39, 235 yards, INT
- BAL – Lamar Jackson – 21/33, 236 yards

Top rushers

- CIN – Alex Erickson – 1 rush, 17 yards
- BAL – Lamar Jackson – 19 rushes, 152 yards, TD

Top receivers

- CIN – Auden Tate – 5 receptions, 91 yards
- BAL – Mark Andrews – 6 receptions, 99 yards

The Bengals scored first when Brandon Wilson returned a kickoff 92 yards for a touchdown. The Ravens however took the lead with a Lamar Jackson 21-yard touchdown to tie the game at 7–7 followed by Mark Ingram's 1-yard touchdown run. In the second quarter, the Ravens made it 17–7 with a Justin Tucker 40-yard field goal. The Bengals followed with a Randy Bullock 22-yard field goal, to make it 17–10 at halftime. In the third quarter, the Ravens got a Tucker 49-yard field goal to make it 20–10, the quarter's only score. In the fourth quarter Tucker kicked a 21-yard field goal, and the Bengals scored on an Andy Dalton 2-yard touchdown. The Bengals' onside kick attempt failed, so the Ravens recovered the ball and ran out the clock. Ravens quarterback Lamar Jackson became the first player in the Super Bowl era to throw for more than 200 yards and run for more than 150 yards in a regular season game.

==== Week 7: Baltimore Ravens 30, Seattle Seahawks 16 ====
Week Seven: Baltimore Ravens at Seattle Seahawks – Game summary

Quarter	1	2	3	4	Total
Ravens	3	10	7	10	30
Seahawks	0	13	0	3	16

at CenturyLink Field, Seattle, Washington

- Date: October 20
- Game time: 4:25 p.m. EDT/1:25 p.m. PDT
- Game weather: Rain, 50 °F (10 °C)
- Game attendance: 69,012
- Referee: Brad Allen
- TV announcers (Fox): Dick Stockton, Mark Schlereth, Ronde Barber, and Jennifer Hale
- Recap, Game Book

Game information

First quarter

- BAL – Justin Tucker 25-yard field goal, 10:19. Ravens 3–0. Drive: 8 plays, 77 yards, 4:41.

Second quarter

- SEA – Tyler Lockett 8-yard pass from Russell Wilson (Jason Myers kick), 14:46. Seahawks 7–3. Drive: 11 plays, 83 yards, 6:00.
- BAL – Justin Tucker 28-yard field goal, 11:06. Seahawks 7–6. Drive: 9 plays, 65 yards, 3:40.
- SEA – Jason Myers 34-yard field goal, 7:35. Seahawks 10–6. Drive: 9 plays, 59 yards, 3:31.
- BAL – Marcus Peters 67-yard interception return (Justin Tucker kick) 5:00. Ravens 13–10.
- SEA – Jason Myers 31-yard field goal, 0:02. Tied 13–13. Drive: 14 plays, 79 yards, 4:58.

Third quarter

- BAL – Lamar Jackson 8-yard run (Justin Tucker kick), 1:20. Ravens 20–13. Drive: 11 plays, 57 yards, 5:26.

Fourth quarter

- BAL – Justin Tucker 22-yard field goal, 3:47. Ravens 23–13. Drive: 13 plays, 86 yards, 9:00.
- BAL – Marlon Humphrey 18-yard fumble return (Justin Tucker kick), 3:37. Ravens 30–13.
- SEA – Jason Myers 35-yard field goal, 1:49. Ravens 30–16. Drive: 9 plays, 63 yards, 1:48.

Top passers

- BAL – Lamar Jackson – 9/20, 143 yards
- SEA – Russell Wilson – 20/41, 241 yards, TD, INT

Top rushers

- BAL – Lamar Jackson – 14 rushes, 116 yards, TD
- SEA – Chris Carson – 21 rushes, 65 yards

Top receivers

- BAL – Miles Boykin – 2 receptions, 55 yards
- SEA – Tyler Lockett – 5 receptions, 61 yards, TD

Five days after becoming a Raven, Marcus Peters intercepted a pass from Russell Wilson and returned it for a 67-yard pick six. Peters' interception was Wilson's first of the season, and Wilson's first interception in his last 207 pass attempts. The interception gave the Ravens a 13–10 lead but the Seahawks tied the game 13–13 by the end of the first half. Late in the fourth quarter, with the Ravens nursing a 10-point lead, the Ravens defense scored its second touchdown of the game as Marlon Humphrey returned a Seahawks fumble for 18 yards and a touchdown and put the game on ice.

==== Week 9: Baltimore Ravens 37, New England Patriots 20 ====
Week Nine: New England Patriots at Baltimore Ravens – Game summary

Quarter	1	2	3	4	Total
Patriots	0	13	7	0	20
Ravens	10	7	7	13	37

at M&T Bank Stadium, Baltimore, Maryland

- Date: November 3
- Game time: 8:20 p.m. EST
- Game weather: Cloudy, 48 °F (9 °C)
- Game attendance: 71,157
- Referee: Carl Cheffers
- TV announcers (NBC): Al Michaels, Cris Collinsworth, Michele Tafoya, and Terry McAulay
- Recap, Game Book

Game information

First quarter

- BAL – Lamar Jackson 3-yard run (Justin Tucker kick), 8:13. Ravens 7–0. Drive: 11 plays, 75 yards, 6:40.
- BAL – Justin Tucker 39-yard field goal, 2:29. Ravens 10–0. Drive: 11 plays, 54 yards, 5:20.

Second quarter

- BAL – Gus Edwards 12-yard run (Justin Tucker kick), 14:06. Ravens 17–0. Drive: 3 plays, 77 yards, 1:35.
- NE – Mohamed Sanu 4-yard pass from Tom Brady (Nick Folk kick), 12:02. Ravens 17–7. Drive: 4 plays, 20 yards, 0:39.
- NE – Nick Folk 22-yard field goal, 3:41. Ravens 17–10. Drive: 6 plays, 15 yards, 2:48.
- NE – Nick Folk 19-yard field goal, 0:08. Ravens 17–13. Drive: 8 plays, 81 yards, 1:35.

Third quarter

- BAL – Marlon Humphrey 70-yard fumble return (Justin Tucker kick), 12:21. Ravens 24–13.
- NE – James White 1-yard run (Nick Folk kick), 8:03. Ravens 24–20. Drive: 11 plays, 75 yards, 4:18.

Fourth quarter

- BAL – Nick Boyle 5-yard pass from Lamar Jackson (kick failed, wide left), 14:54. Ravens 30–20. Drive: 14 plays, 81 yards, 8:09.
- BAL – Lamar Jackson 1-yard run (Justin Tucker kick), 3:12. Ravens 37–20. Drive: 14 plays, 68 yards, 9:35.

Top passers

- NE – Tom Brady – 30/46, 285 yards, TD, INT
- BAL – Lamar Jackson – 17/23, 163 yards, TD

Top rushers

- NE – James White – 9 rushes, 38 yards
- BAL – Mark Ingram II – 15 rushes, 115 yards

Top receivers

- NE – Julian Edelman – 10 receptions, 89 yards
- BAL – Marquise Brown – 3 receptions, 48 yards

The Ravens hosted the unbeaten Patriots for the teams' first meeting since 2016, handing New England its first loss since Week 15 of the previous season as Baltimore rushed for 210 yards. On the game's first drive, the Ravens converted twice on 3rd down. Seven of the Ravens plays in the first drive were runs by Lamar Jackson, Mark Ingram II, and Gus Edwards. On a crucial third down, the Patriots had held and the Ravens would have been forced to try a field goal but a neutral zone infraction by Shilque Calhoun gave the Ravens a first down which led to a 3-yard rushing touchdown by quarterback Lamar Jackson. On the Patriots' first possession, Tom Brady threw three straight incomplete passes, which led to a punt. The next drive the Patriots held the Ravens to a field goal. The Patriots, however had to punt again after Brady was sacked by Patrick Onwuasor. With a 10–0 lead, the Ravens started the second quarter with another long drive, highlighted by a 53-yard run by Ingram and a 12-yard touchdown run by Gus Edwards. The Ravens then forced another Patriots three-and-out but Cyrus Jones muffed the punt and the Patriots got the ball back at the Baltimore 20-yard line, which led to a Brady to Mohamed Sanu touchdown. The Patriots added two field goals and ended the half trailing only by four, 17–13.

On the Patriots' first drive in the third quarter, the Ravens forced a Julian Edelman fumble which was returned 70 yards by Marlon Humphrey for a touchdown extending the Ravens lead to 24–13. The Patriots answered with a 4-yard rushing touchdown by James White. The Ravens then mounted an eight-minute, 14-play drive ending with a 5-yard pass to Nick Boyle to make the lead 30–20. In the fourth quarter, Earl Thomas intercepted a Brady pass and the Ravens mounted another 14 play drive ending with a Jackson 1-yard rushing touchdown, making the lead 37–20.

Marlon Humphrey's 70-yard fumble return was the longest fumble return in Ravens history. Also, Nick Boyle's touchdown was the first of his career. This was also the Ravens' first win over the Patriots since the 2012 AFC Championship game in Gillette Stadium. Lamar Jackson became the first second year or rookie quarterback to defeat the Patriots since 2013.

==== Week 10: Baltimore Ravens 49, Cincinnati Bengals 13 ====
Week Ten: Baltimore Ravens at Cincinnati Bengals – Game summary

Quarter	1	2	3	4	Total
Ravens	14	14	21	0	49
Bengals	0	10	0	3	13

at Paul Brown Stadium, Cincinnati, Ohio

- Date: November 10
- Game time: 1:00 p.m. EST
- Game weather: Sunny, 56 °F (13 °C)
- Game attendance: 45,918
- Referee: Scott Novak
- TV announcers (CBS): Kevin Harlan, Rich Gannon, and Jay Feely
- Recap, Game Book

Game information

First quarter

- BAL – Mark Andrews 2-yard pass from Lamar Jackson (Justin Tucker kick), 12:18. Ravens 7–0. Drive: 5 plays, 75 yards, 2:42.
- BAL – Mark Ingram II 1-yard run (Justin Tucker kick), 3:54. Ravens 14–0. Drive: 12 plays, 75 yards, 7:22.

Second quarter

- CIN – Randy Bullock 42-yard field goal, 13:34. Ravens 14–3. Drive: 10 plays, 52 yards, 5:20.
- BAL – Mark Andrews 17-yard pass from Lamar Jackson (Justin Tucker kick), 9:28. Ravens 21–3. Drive: 7 plays, 75 yards, 4:06.
- BAL – Marcus Peters 89-yard interception return (Justin Tucker kick), 3:42. Ravens 28–3.
- CIN – Tyler Eifert 6-yard pass from Ryan Finley (Randy Bullock kick), 0:26. Ravens 28–10. Drive: 10 plays, 70 yards, 3:16.

Third quarter

- BAL – Lamar Jackson 47-yard run (Justin Tucker kick), 8:08. Ravens 35–10. Drive: 3 plays, 64 yards, 1:25.
- BAL – Marquise Brown 20-yard pass from Lamar Jackson (Justin Tucker kick), 5:13. Ravens 42–10. Drive: 4 plays, 33 yards, 1:28.
- BAL – Tyus Bowser 33-yard fumble return (Justin Tucker kick), 2:14. Ravens 49–10.

Fourth quarter

- CIN – Randy Bullock 39-yard field goal, 2:29. Ravens 49–13. Drive: 10 plays, 38 yards, 5:42.

Top passers

- BAL – Lamar Jackson – 15/17, 223 yards, 3 TD
- CIN – Ryan Finley – 16/30, 167 yards, TD, INT

Top rushers

- BAL – Lamar Jackson – 7 rushes, 65 yards, TD
- CIN – Joe Mixon – 30 rushes, 114 yards

Top receivers

- BAL – Marquise Brown – 4 receptions, 80 yards, TD
- CIN – Tyler Boyd – 6 receptions, 62 yards

The Ravens scored first when Lamar Jackson found Mark Andrews on a 2-yard touchdown pass. It was 14–0 after a Mark Ingram II 1-yard touchdown run. In the second quarter, the Bengals got a Randy Bullock 42-yard field goal; but the Ravens then pulled away as Jackson found Andrews again on a 17-yard touchdown pass to make it 21–3. Marcus Peters then returned an interception 89 yards for a touchdown to make it 28–3. The Bengals came within 18 points at halftime when Ryan Finley found Tyler Boyd on a 6-yard touchdown pass. The Ravens scored three more touchdowns to open the second half. First, Jackson ran for one from 47 yards out, then Jackson found Marquise Brown for a 20-yard touchdown pass, and then Tyus Bowser returned a fumble 33 yards for a touchdown.

With the win, the Ravens won five consecutive regular season games for the first time since 2006 and also had a season sweep of the Bengals for the first time since 2011. Lamar Jackson finished with his second perfect passer rating on the season, making him the second player in NFL history to perform the feat.

==== Week 11: Baltimore Ravens 41, Houston Texans 7 ====
Week Eleven: Houston Texans at Baltimore Ravens – Game summary

Quarter	1	2	3	4	Total
Texans	0	0	0	7	7
Ravens	0	14	13	14	41

at M&T Bank Stadium, Baltimore, Maryland

- Date: November 17
- Game time: 1:00 p.m. EST
- Game weather: Cloudy, 44 °F (7 °C)
- Game attendance: 70,731
- Referee: Alex Kemp
- TV announcers (CBS): Ian Eagle, Dan Fouts, and Evan Washburn
- Recap, Game Book

Game information

First quarter

- No scoring plays.

Second quarter

- BAL – Seth Roberts 15-yard pass from Lamar Jackson (Justin Tucker kick), 9:17. Ravens 7–0. Drive: 10 plays, 90 yards, 5:46.
- BAL – Mark Andrews 18-yard pass from Lamar Jackson (Justin Tucker kick), 2:14. Ravens 14–0. Drive: 7 plays, 70 yards, 4:22.

Third quarter

- BAL – Mark Ingram II 25-yard pass from Lamar Jackson (Justin Tucker kick), 11:33. Ravens 21–0. Drive: 6 plays, 78 yards, 3:27.
- BAL – Justin Tucker 34-yard field goal, 6:52. Ravens 24–0. Drive: 6 plays, 52 yards, 2:49.
- BAL – Justin Tucker 46-yard field goal, 1:30. Ravens 27–0. Drive: 6 plays, 11 yards, 3:14.

Fourth quarter

- BAL – Mark Ingram II 12-yard pass from Lamar Jackson (Justin Tucker kick), 9:50. Ravens 34–0. Drive: 8 plays, 71 yards, 4:52.
- HOU – Carlos Hyde 41-yard run (Kaʻimi Fairbairn kick), 7:10. Ravens 34–7. Drive: 5 plays, 77 yards, 2:40.
- BAL – Gus Edwards 63-yard run (Justin Tucker kick), 4:01. Ravens 41–7. Drive: 5 plays, 87 yards, 3:09.

Top passers

- HOU – Deshaun Watson – 18/29, 169 yards, INT
- BAL – Lamar Jackson – 17/24, 222 yards, 4 TD

Top rushers

- HOU – Carlos Hyde – 9 rushes, 65 yards, TD
- BAL – Gus Edwards – 8 rushes, 112 yards, TD

Top receivers

- HOU – DeAndre Hopkins – 7 receptions, 80 yards
- BAL – Mark Andrews – 4 receptions, 75 yards, TD

Jackson threw four touchdowns in the game, becoming the first quarterback in Ravens franchise history to throw four or more touchdowns in a game multiple times during the regular season. Jackson also rushed for 86 yards during the victory over the Texans making him the only quarterback in NFL history to rush for more than 60 yards in seven consecutive games.

==== Week 12: Baltimore Ravens 45, Los Angeles Rams 6 ====
Week Twelve: Baltimore Ravens at Los Angeles Rams – Game summary

Quarter	1	2	3	4	Total
Ravens	14	14	7	10	45
Rams	0	6	0	0	6

at Los Angeles Memorial Coliseum, Los Angeles, California

- Date: November 25
- Game time: 8:15 p.m. EST/5:15 p.m. PST
- Game weather: Clear, 62 °F (17 °C)
- Game attendance: 72,409
- Referee: Craig Wrolstad
- TV announcers (ESPN): Joe Tessitore, Booger McFarland, Lisa Salters, and John Parry
- Recap, Game Book

Game information

First quarter

- BAL – Marquise Brown 6-yard pass from Lamar Jackson (Justin Tucker kick), 7:47. Ravens 7–0. Drive: 9 plays, 55 yards, 5:48.
- BAL – Marquise Brown 18-yard pass from Lamar Jackson (Justin Tucker kick), 1:31. Ravens 14–0. Drive: 7 plays, 61 yards, 3:49.

Second quarter

- LAR – Greg Zuerlein 42-yard field goal, 9:45. Ravens 14–3. Drive: 15 plays, 61 yards, 6:46.
- BAL – Mark Ingram II 1-yard run (Justin Tucker kick), 4:42. Ravens 21–3. Drive: 8 plays, 75 yards, 5:03.
- LAR – Greg Zuerlin 46-yard field goal, 1:55. Ravens 21–6. Drive: 6 plays, 48 yards, 2:47.
- BAL – Willie Snead 7-yard pass from Lamar Jackson (Justin Tucker kick), 0:12. Ravens 28–6. Drive: 7 plays, 61 yards, 3:49.

Third quarter

- BAL – Mark Ingram II 7-yard pass from Lamar Jackson (Justin Tucker kick), 9:46. Ravens 35–6. Drive: 10 plays, 75 yards, 5:14.

Fourth quarter

- BAL – Willie Snead 7-yard pass from Lamar Jackson (Justin Tucker kick), 14:43. Ravens 42–6. 17 plays, 78 yards, 9:04.
- BAL – Justin Tucker 34-yard field goal, 6:35. Ravens 45–6. Drive: 11 plays, 48 yards, 6:01.

Top passers

- BAL – Lamar Jackson – 15/20, 169 yards, 5 TD
- LAR – Jared Goff – 26/37, 212 yards, 2 INT

Top rushers

- BAL – Mark Ingram II – 15 rushes, 111 yards, TD
- LAR – Todd Gurley – 6 rushes, 22 yards

Top receivers

- BAL – Miles Boykin – 2 receptions, 54 yards
- LAR – Robert Woods – 6 receptions, 97 yards

The Ravens became the fourth team in the 21st century to score touchdowns on their first six drives in a game. During the game, Lamar Jackson became the first player in NFL history to rush for at least 1,500 yards and pass for more than 3,000 yards in his first two seasons. Jackson's five touchdown passes made him the NFL's first player with that many touchdown passes in a Monday Night Football debut and the youngest player ever (22 years old) with multiple five touchdown passing games. The Ravens also won seven straight games for the first time since their 2000 Super Bowl-winning season. Jackson was also named the AFC Player of the Month for the month of November.

==== Week 13: Baltimore Ravens 20, San Francisco 49ers 17 ====
Week Thirteen: San Francisco 49ers at Baltimore Ravens – Game summary

Quarter	1	2	3	4	Total
49ers	7	7	3	0	17
Ravens	7	10	0	3	20

at M&T Bank Stadium, Baltimore, Maryland

- Date: December 1
- Game time: 1:00 p.m. EST
- Game weather: Rain, 40 °F (4 °C)
- Game attendance: 71,029
- Referee: Brad Allen
- TV announcers (Fox): Kevin Burkhardt, Charles Davis, and Pam Oliver
- Recap, Game Book

Game information

First quarter

- SF – Deebo Samuel 33-yard pass from Jimmy Garoppolo (Robbie Gould kick), 11:53. 49ers 7–0. Drive: 7 plays, 74 yards, 3:07.
- BAL – Mark Andrews 20-yard pass from Lamar Jackson (Justin Tucker kick), 5:41. Tied 7–7. Drive: 2 plays, 23 yards, 0:47.

Second quarter

- BAL – Lamar Jackson 1-yard run (Justin Tucker kick), 11:58. Ravens 14–7. Drive: 13 plays, 84 yards, 7:15.
- SF – Raheem Mostert 40-yard run (Robbie Gould kick), 9:12. Tied 14–14. Drive: 5 plays, 75 yards, 2:46.
- BAL – Justin Tucker 30-yard field goal, 1:58. Ravens 17–14. Drive: 13 plays, 63 yards, 7:14.

Third quarter

- SF – Robbie Gould 32-yard field goal, 3:37. Tied 17–17. Drive: 14 plays, 66 yards, 8:26.

Fourth quarter

- BAL – Justin Tucker 49-yard field goal, 0:00. Ravens 20–17. Drive: 12 plays, 34 yards, 6:25.

Top passers

- SF – Jimmy Garoppolo – 15/21, 165 yards, TD
- BAL – Lamar Jackson – 14/23, 105 yards, TD

Top rushers

- SF – Raheem Mostert – 19 rushes, 146 yards, TD
- BAL – Lamar Jackson – 16 rushes, 101 yards, TD

Top receivers

- SF – Kendrick Bourne – 3 receptions, 42 yards
- BAL – Mark Andrews – 3 receptions, 50 yards, TD

The 49ers opened the game with a touchdown on their first possession, which was the first time on the season that the Ravens had allowed an opponent a touchdown on the first drive. On the following drive, 49ers QB Jimmy Garoppolo was sacked and lost a fumble. Two plays later, the Ravens scored on a 20-yard pass from Lamar Jackson to Mark Andrews. This was the 48th touchdown of the season and the most touchdowns by any Ravens team in franchise history. After a 49ers punt, Jackson orchestrated a 13-play drive culminating with him running the ball in from the 1-yard line for a touchdown. The 49ers answered with a touchdown, but the Ravens countered with a field goal and the half ended with the Ravens up by three. In the opening drive of the second half, Jackson was stripped of the ball by 49ers safety Marcell Harris at the 49ers' 20-yard line. The 49ers then completed a 14-play drive lasting almost eight-and-a-half minutes, but were forced to kick a field goal which tied the game at 17. Neither team could score in the fourth quarter until the 6:28 mark when the Ravens drove the ball down to the 49ers' 31 where Justin Tucker kicked a 49-yard game-winning field goal as time expired. With the win, the Ravens improved to 10–2 for the first time in franchise history and extend their winning streak to 8 games, also a franchise record. The Ravens were also the only AFC North team to sweep the entire NFC West in 2019.

==== Week 14: Baltimore Ravens 24, Buffalo Bills 17 ====
Week Fourteen: Baltimore Ravens at Buffalo Bills – Game summary

Quarter	1	2	3	4	Total
Ravens	3	7	7	7	24
Bills	0	6	3	8	17

at New Era Field, Orchard Park, New York

- Date: December 8
- Game time: 1:00 p.m. EST
- Game weather: Windy, 43 °F (6 °C)
- Game attendance: 69,134
- Referee: Shawn Smith
- TV announcers (CBS): Ian Eagle, Dan Fouts, and Evan Washburn
- Recap, Game Book

Game information

First quarter

- BAL – Justin Tucker 36-yard field goal, 4:56. Ravens 3–0. Drive: 8 plays, 27 yards, 4:20.

Second quarter

- BAL – Nick Boyle 3-yard pass from Lamar Jackson (Justin Tucker kick), 13:31. Ravens 10–0. Drive: 5 plays, 24 yards, 2:25.
- BUF – Stephen Hauschka 36-yard field goal, 8:20. Ravens 10–3. Drive: 11 plays, 55 yards, 5:11.
- BUF – Stephen Hauschka 47-yard field goal, 0:25. Ravens 10–6. Drive: 7 plays, 20 yards, 1:33.

Third quarter

- BAL – Hayden Hurst 61-yard pass from Lamar Jackson (Justin Tucker kick), 13:34. Ravens 17–6. Drive: 3 plays, 75 yards, 1:26.

Fourth quarter

- BUF – Stephen Hauschka 48-yard field goal, 11:26. Ravens 17–9. Drive: 7 plays, 51 yards, 2:08.
- BAL – Willie Snead 4-yard pass from Lamar Jackson (Justin Tucker kick), 9:49. Ravens 24–9. Drive: 9 plays, 51 yards, 5:02.
- BUF – Cole Beasley 4-yard pass from Josh Allen (Josh Allen–Cole Beasley pass), 7:00. Ravens 24–17. Drive: 7 plays, 78 yards, 2:49.

Top passers

- BAL – Lamar Jackson – 16/25, 145 yards, 3 TD, INT
- BUF – Josh Allen – 17/39, 146 yards, TD

Top rushers

- BAL – Mark Ingram II – 15 rushes, 50 yards
- BUF – Devin Singletary – 18 rushes, 89 yards

Top receivers

- BAL – Hayden Hurst – 3 receptions, 73 yards, TD
- BUF – Dawson Knox – 1 reception, 37 yards

Lamar Jackson became the second ever quarterback behind Michael Vick to reach 1,000 rushing yards. The Ravens improved to 11–2 for the first time in franchise history and extend their winning streak to nine games, also a franchise record. Also, a light moment in an otherwise competitive game occurred in the third quarter when some pages from Ravens special teams coach Randy Brown's playbook blew onto the field and Bills cornerback Tre'Davious White retrieved them. When the referee noticed that White was actually examining the pages, he ran over to White and snatched them from him.

==== Week 15: Baltimore Ravens 42, New York Jets 21 ====
Week Fifteen: New York Jets at Baltimore Ravens – Game summary

Quarter	1	2	3	4	Total
Jets	0	7	0	14	21
Ravens	13	8	14	7	42

at M&T Bank Stadium, Baltimore, Maryland

- Date: December 12
- Game time: 8:20 p.m. EST
- Game weather: Cloudy, 34 °F (1 °C)
- Game attendance: 70,545
- Referee: John Hussey
- TV announcers (Fox/NFLN/Amazon Prime): Joe Buck, Troy Aikman, Erin Andrews, Kristina Pink, and Mike Pereira
- Recap, Game Book

Game information

First quarter

- BAL – Mark Ingram II 6-yard run (Justin Tucker kick), 7:49. Ravens 7–0. Drive: 9 plays, 84 yards, 5:40.
- BAL – Miles Boykin 5-yard pass from Lamar Jackson (kick failed, wide left), 2:50. Ravens 13–0. Drive: 5 plays, 61 yards, 2:19.

Second quarter

- NYJ – Jamison Crowder 4-yard pass from Sam Darnold (Sam Ficken kick), 13:27. Ravens 13–7. Drive: 8 plays, 63 yards, 4:23.
- BAL – Mark Andrews 1-yard pass from Lamar Jackson (Mark Ingram II run), 9:43. Ravens 21–7. Drive: 6 plays, 75 yards, 3:44.

Third quarter

- BAL – Marquise Brown 24-yard pass from Lamar Jackson (Justin Tucker kick), 5:09. Ravens 28–7. Drive: 2 plays, 24 yards, 0:11.
- BAL – Seth Roberts 33-yard pass from Lamar Jackson (Justin Tucker kick), 0:58. Ravens 35–7. Drive: 7 plays, 80 yards, 2:58.

Fourth quarter

- NYJ – B. J. Bello 14-yard return of blocked punt (kick failed, wide right), 12:07. Ravens 35–13.
- BAL – Mark Ingram II 10-yard pass from Lamar Jackson (Justin Tucker kick), 9:58. Ravens 42–13. Drive: 5 plays, 44 yards, 2:09.
- NYJ – Jamison Crowder 18-yard pass from Sam Darnold (Sam Darnold–Robby Anderson pass), 7:35. Ravens 42–21. Drive: 4 plays, 64 yards, 2:23.

Top passers

- NYJ – Sam Darnold – 18/32, 218 yards, 2 TD, INT
- BAL – Lamar Jackson – 15/23, 212 yards, 5 TD

Top rushers

- NYJ – Le'Veon Bell – 21 rushes, 87 yards
- BAL – Lamar Jackson – 8 rushes, 86 yards

Top receivers

- NYJ – Jamison Crowder – 6 receptions, 90 yards, 2 TD
- BAL – Seth Roberts – 3 receptions, 66 yards, TD

Lamar Jackson threw 5 touchdown passes and broke the NFL record for rushing yards by a quarterback in a season as the Ravens won the AFC North title. Mark Andrews caught his eighth touchdown of the season, breaking a franchise record for most touchdowns by a Ravens tight end in a single season, previously held by Todd Heap.

==== Week 16: Baltimore Ravens 31, Cleveland Browns 15 ====
Week Sixteen: Baltimore Ravens at Cleveland Browns – Game summary

Quarter	1	2	3	4	Total
Ravens	0	14	7	10	31
Browns	0	6	3	6	15

at FirstEnergy Stadium, Cleveland, Ohio

- Date: December 22
- Game time: 1:00 p.m. EST
- Game weather: Sunny, 49 °F (9 °C)
- Game attendance: 67,431
- Referee: Alex Kemp
- TV announcers (CBS): Jim Nantz, Tony Romo, Tracy Wolfson, and Gene Steratore
- Recap, Game Book

Game information

First quarter

- No scoring plays.

Second quarter

- CLE – Demetrius Harris 1-yard pass from Baker Mayfield (kick failed, wide left), 11:53. Browns 6–0. Drive: 9 plays, 45 yards, 5:19.
- BAL – Mark Andrews 39-yard pass from Lamar Jackson (Justin Tucker kick), 1:18. Ravens 7–6. Drive: 2 plays, 63 yards, 0:32.
- BAL – Mark Andrews 14-yard pass from Lamar Jackson (Justin Tucker kick), 0:09. Ravens 14–6. Drive: 7 plays, 75 yards, 0:46.

Third quarter

- BAL – Mark Ingram II 12-yard pass from Lamar Jackson (Justin Tucker kick), 7:36. Ravens 21–6. Drive: 13 plays, 69 yards, 7:24.
- CLE – Austin Seibert 47-yard field goal, 3:25. Ravens 21–9. Drive: 10 plays, 46 yards, 4:11.

Fourth quarter

- BAL – Justin Tucker 31-yard field goal, 11:32. Ravens 24–9. Drive: 12 plays, 62 yards, 6:53.
- CLE – Odell Beckham Jr. 3-yard pass from Baker Mayfield (pass failed), 8:01. Ravens 24–15. Drive: 9 plays, 75 yards, 3:31.
- BAL – Justice Hill – 18-yard run (Justin Tucker kick), 3:39. Ravens 31–15. Drive: 8 plays, 84 yards, 4:22.

Top passers

- BAL – Lamar Jackson – 20/31, 238 yards, 3 TD
- CLE – Baker Mayfield – 20/33, 192 yards, 2 TD, INT

Top rushers

- BAL – Lamar Jackson – 17 rushes, 103 yards
- CLE – Nick Chubb – 15 rushes, 45 yards

Top receivers

- BAL – Mark Andrews – 6 receptions, 93 yards, 2 TD
- CLE – Jarvis Landry – 7 receptions, 74 yards

The Browns held the Ravens scoreless for the first 28 minutes of the game while they took a 6–0 lead. But with less than two minutes remaining in the half Lamar Jackson hit Mark Andrews with 2 touchdown passes and the Ravens took a 14–6 lead into the locker room at half-time.

In the second half, Jackson tossed another touchdown, this time to Mark Ingram II and then the Ravens running game sealed the victory with Mark Ingram II and Justice Hill rushing touchdowns. Lamar Jackson's touchdown pass to Mark Andrews in the second quarter broke the Ravens single-season touchdown pass record with 34, a record previously held by Vinny Testaverde. With the win, the Ravens clinched home-field advantage for the entire AFC playoffs.

The Ravens defense limited the league's top rusher, Cleveland running back Nick Chubb, to 45 yards; his lowest output of the 2019 season. Chubb had gashed the Ravens' defense for 165 yards and 3 touchdowns in their week 4 match-up. On the day after the Ravens' victory over the Browns, and due to the Ravens' having clinched home-field advantage, head coach John Harbaugh announced that quarterback Lamar Jackson, guard Marshal Yanda, safety Earl Thomas III and defensive tackle Brandon Williams will be inactive for the Week 17 game against the Pittsburgh Steelers. Harbaugh also announced that running back Mark Ingram II will not play; allowing him to recover from the calf injury he sustained in the Browns game.

==== Week 17: Baltimore Ravens 28, Pittsburgh Steelers 10 ====
Week Seventeen: Pittsburgh Steelers at Baltimore Ravens – Game summary

Quarter	1	2	3	4	Total
Steelers	0	7	3	0	10
Ravens	6	10	0	12	28

at M&T Bank Stadium, Baltimore, Maryland

- Date: December 29
- Game time: 4:25 p.m. EST
- Game weather: Rain, 46 °F (8 °C)
- Game attendance: 70,695
- Referee: Bill Vinovich
- TV announcers (CBS): Ian Eagle, Dan Fouts, and Evan Washburn
- Recap, Game Book

Game information

First quarter

- BAL – Justin Tucker 45-yard field goal, 7:56. Ravens 3–0. Drive: 11 plays, 40 yards, 7:04.
- BAL – Justin Tucker 22-yard field goal, 2:40. Ravens 6–0. Drive: 9 plays, 61 yards, 4:24.

Second quarter

- PIT – Benny Snell 4-yard run (Chris Boswell kick), 12:50. Steelers 7–6. Drive: 10 plays, 75 yards, 4:50.
- BAL – Justin Tucker 22-yard field goal, 1:10. Ravens 9–7. Drive: 9 plays, 56 yards, 4:06.
- BAL – Justice Hill 8-yard run (Justin Tucker kick), 0:21. Ravens 16–7. Drive: 4 plays, 23 yards, 0:24.

Third quarter

- PIT – Chris Boswell 26-yard field goal, 9:55. Ravens 16–10. Drive: 7 plays, 26 yards, 3:21.

Fourth quarter

- BAL – Justin Tucker 47-yard field goal, 13:29. Ravens 19–10. Drive: 8 plays, 34 yards, 4:13.
- BAL – Jordan Richards fumble recovery in end zone (Justin Tucker kick), 4:36. Ravens 26–10.
- BAL – Penalty on Devlin Hodges enforced in end zone for a safety, 4:21. Ravens 28–10.

Top passers

- PIT – Devlin Hodges – 9/25, 95 yards
- BAL – Robert Griffin III – 11/21, 96 yards, INT

Top rushers

- PIT – Benny Snell – 18 rushes, 91 yards, TD
- BAL – Gus Edwards – 21 rushes, 130 yards

Top receivers

- PIT – Diontae Johnson – 4 receptions, 54 yards
- BAL – Hayden Hurst – 2 receptions, 35 yards

On a rain-soaked field, with Robert Griffin III at quarterback, the Ravens kept the ball on the ground for their first drive. The drive covered 40 yards, took 7 minutes off the clock and culminated with a 45-yard Justin Tucker field goal. After the Ravens defense forced a three-and-out, the Ravens offense, highlighted by a Gus Edwards 38-yard run, drove down the field again, this time settling for a Tucker 22-yard field goal. The Steelers took the lead early in the second quarter after a Benny Snell 4-yard touchdown run. The Ravens regained the lead, 9–7, with another Tucker field goal with 1:10 remaining in the half. The Ravens got the ball back with 54 seconds left in the half when Matthew Judon sacked Steelers quarterback Devlin Hodges forcing him to fumble. Justice Hill's 8-yard touchdown run capped a 23-yard drive for the Ravens, who ended the half with a 16–7 lead. After the teams exchanged field goals, the Ravens defense, late in the fourth quarter, stripped the ball from Steelers punter Jordan Berry and recovered it in the end zone for a touchdown. On the next Steelers possession the Ravens were awarded 2 points after Devlin Hodges was called for intentional grounding in the end zone, making the final score 28–10 Ravens.

With the win, the Ravens finished the season with a franchise best 14–2 record surpassing their 13–3 campaign in 2006. They also swept the Steelers for the first time since the 2015 season.

== Standings ==
=== Division ===
AFC North
	W	L	T	PCT	DIV	CONF	PF	PA	STK
^{(1)} Baltimore Ravens	14	2	0	.875	5–1	10–2	531	282	W12
Pittsburgh Steelers	8	8	0	.500	3–3	6–6	289	303	L3
Cleveland Browns	6	10	0	.375	3–3	6–6	335	393	L3
Cincinnati Bengals	2	14	0	.125	1–5	2–10	279	420	W1

=== Conference ===
AFC
#	Team	Division	W	L	T	PCT	DIV	CONF	SOS	SOV	STK
Division leaders
1	Baltimore Ravens	North	14	2	0	.875	5–1	10–2	.494	.484	W12
2 (Note: Kansas City claimed the No. 2 seed over New England based on head-to-head victory.)	Kansas City Chiefs	West	12	4	0	.750	6–0	9–3	.510	.477	W6
3	New England Patriots	East	12	4	0	.750	5–1	8–4	.469	.411	L1
4	Houston Texans	South	10	6	0	.625	4–2	8–4	.520	.488	L1
Wild Cards
5	Buffalo Bills	East	10	6	0	.625	3–3	7–5	.461	.363	L2
6	Tennessee Titans	South	9	7	0	.563	3–3	7–5	.488	.465	W1
Did not qualify for the postseason
7	Pittsburgh Steelers	North	8	8	0	.500	3–3	6–6	.502	.324	L3
8 (Note: Denver finished ahead of Indianapolis and NY Jets based on conference record. Division tiebreak was initially used to eliminate Oakland (see below).) (Note: Denver finished ahead of Oakland based on conference record.)	Denver Broncos	West	7	9	0	.438	3–3	6–6	.510	.406	W2
9 (Note: Oakland and Indianapolis finished ahead of NY Jets based on conference record.) (Note: Oakland finished ahead of Indianapolis based on head-to-head victory.)	Oakland Raiders	West	7	9	0	.438	3–3	5–7	.482	.335	L1
10	Indianapolis Colts	South	7	9	0	.438	3–3	5–7	.492	.500	L1
11	New York Jets	East	7	9	0	.438	2–4	4–8	.473	.402	W2
12 (Note: Jacksonville finished ahead of Cleveland based on record against common opponents. Jacksonville's cumulative record against Cincinnati, Denver, NY Jets, and Tennessee was 4–1, compared to Cleveland's 2–3 cumulative record against the same four teams.)	Jacksonville Jaguars	South	6	10	0	.375	2–4	6–6	.484	.406	W1
13	Cleveland Browns	North	6	10	0	.375	3–3	6–6	.533	.479	L3
14 (Note: LA Chargers finished ahead of Miami based on head-to-head victory.)	Los Angeles Chargers	West	5	11	0	.313	0–6	3–9	.514	.488	L3
15	Miami Dolphins	East	5	11	0	.313	2–4	4–8	.484	.463	W2
16	Cincinnati Bengals	North	2	14	0	.125	1–5	2–10	.553	.406	W1
Tiebreakers (Note: When breaking ties for three or more teams under the NFL's rules, they are first broken within divisions, then comparing only the highest ranked remaining team from each division.)

== Postseason ==
=== Schedule ===
The Ravens clinched a playoff berth following their Week 14 win over the Buffalo Bills. They clinched the AFC North division following their Week 15 win over the New York Jets, guaranteeing at least one home playoff game. They clinched home-field advantage throughout the AFC playoffs with their Week 16 victory against the Cleveland Browns.

Round	Date	Opponent (seed)	Result	Record	Venue	Recap
Wild Card	First-round bye					
Divisional	January 11, 2020	Tennessee Titans (6)	L 12–28	0–1	M&T Bank Stadium	Recap

=== Game summaries ===
==== AFC Divisional Playoffs: vs. (6) Tennessee Titans ====
Divisional Round: (6) Tennessee Titans at (1) Baltimore Ravens – Game summary

Quarter	1	2	3	4	Total
Titans	7	7	14	0	28
Ravens	0	6	0	6	12

at M&T Bank Stadium, Baltimore, Maryland

- Date: January 11, 2020
- Game time: 8:15 p.m. EST
- Game weather: Cloudy, 69 °F (21 °C)
- Game attendance: 71,254
- Referee: Bill Vinovich
- TV announcers (CBS): Ian Eagle, Dan Fouts, Evan Washburn and Gene Steratore
- Recap, Game Book

Game information

First quarter

- TEN – Jonnu Smith 12-yard pass from Ryan Tannehill (Greg Joseph kick), 3:36. Titans 7–0. Drive: 8 plays, 35 yards, 4:13.

Second quarter

- TEN – Kalif Raymond 45-yard pass from Ryan Tannehill (Greg Joseph kick), 14:45. Titans 14–0. Drive: 1 play, 45 yards, 0:08.
- BAL – Justin Tucker 49-yard field goal, 5:52. Titans 14–3. Drive: 12 plays, 59 yards, 5:21.
- BAL – Justin Tucker 22-yard field goal, 0:00. Titans 14–6. Drive: 14 plays, 91 yards, 2:32.

Third quarter

- TEN – Corey Davis 3-yard pass from Derrick Henry (Greg Joseph kick), 6:54. Titans 21–6. Drive: 6 plays, 81 yards, 3:01.
- TEN – Ryan Tannehill 1-yard run (Greg Joseph kick), 4:16. Titans 28–6. Drive: 6 plays, 20 yards, 2:28.

Fourth quarter

- BAL – Hayden Hurst 15-yard pass from Lamar Jackson (pass failed), 11:04. Titans 28–12. Drive: 10 plays, 88 yards, 3:45.

Top passers

- TEN – Ryan Tannehill – 7/14, 88 yards, 2 TD
- BAL – Lamar Jackson – 31/59, 365 yards, TD, 2 INT

Top rushers

- TEN – Derrick Henry – 30 rushes, 195 yards
- BAL – Lamar Jackson – 20 rushes, 143 yards

Top receivers

- TEN – Kalif Raymond – 1 reception, 45 yards
- BAL – Marquise Brown – 7 receptions, 126 yards

Titans running back Derrick Henry accounted for most of the Tennessee offense, accounting for 205 of their 300 total yards. Meanwhile, Baltimore racked up 530 yards, but their three turnovers and four failed fourth-down conversion attempts proved too much to overcome. As a result, Baltimore became the first number 1 seed in the playoffs to lose to the number 6 seed since the New England Patriots lost to the New York Jets in 2010.

On the Ravens' first drive of the game, Lamar Jackson threw a pass that bounced off the hands of Mark Andrews and was intercepted by safety Kevin Byard, who returned it 31 yards, with an unnecessary roughness penalty against Jackson for a horse-collar tackle adding another 15 yards and giving Tennessee a first down on the Ravens' 35-yard line. Henry then carried the ball 4 times for 22 yards on an 8-play drive that ended with Ryan Tannehill's 12-yard touchdown pass to tight end Jonnu Smith, who made a leaping one-handed catch in the back of the end zone. After getting the ball back, Baltimore drove to a 4th-and-1 on their own 45-yard line. Jackson attempted to convert with a quarterback sneak, but he was tackled by linebacker David Long Jr. for no gain on the last play of the first quarter. On the next play, Tannehill gave the team a 14–0 lead with a 45-yard touchdown pass to Kalif Raymond. Following a punt from each team, Jackson completed a 30-yard pass to Marquise Brown and a 16-yard pass to Andrews, setting up Justin Tucker's 49-yard field goal to make the score 14–3. Then after a Titans punt, Jackson completed a 26-yard pass to Seth Roberts, as well as two completions to Brown for gains of 16 yards and 38 yards on a 91-yard drive. Tucker finished it off with a 22-yard field goal as time expired in the half, making the score 14–6 at halftime.

Baltimore took the second half kickoff and drove to a 4th-and-1 on the Titans' 18-yard line. Jackson again tried to convert with a run, but was stopped for no gain by linebacker Harold Landry. Two plays later on 3rd and 1, Henry took a handoff through the middle and ran for a 66-yard gain, to the Ravens' 6-yard line. Then when faced with 3rd and goal from the 3-yard line, Henry took a direct snap out of wildcat formation and threw a jump pass to Corey Davis for a touchdown. This gave Tennessee a 21–6 lead and made Henry the first running back to throw a touchdown pass in the postseason since Allen Rice in the 1987 season. On the first play of the Ravens' next possession, defensive end Jurrell Casey forced a fumble while sacking Jackson, which Jeffery Simmons recovered for Tennessee on the Baltimore 20-yard line. From there, the Titans drove to a 28–6 lead, scoring on a 6-play drive that ended with Tannehill's 1-yard touchdown run. Baltimore responded with a drive to the Titans' 36-yard line, only to lose the ball again with a Jackson pass that was intercepted by safety Kenny Vaccaro. After forcing Tennessee to punt, the Ravens finally managed to score a touchdown, moving the ball 83 yards in 10 plays, the longest a 27-yard run by Jackson. Jackson finished the drive with a 15-yard touchdown pass to tight end Hayden Hurst, but his subsequent two-point conversion pass was incomplete, keeping the score at 28–12. Tennessee's defense then pinned down Baltimore for the rest of the game, forcing a turnover on downs on the Ravens' final two possessions.

Henry finished the game with 30 carries for 195 yards, while also catching two passes for 7 yards and throwing a 3-yard touchdown pass. He became the first player to rush for over 180 yards twice in the same postseason. Jackson completed 31 of 59 passes for 365 yards and a touchdown, with two interceptions, while also rushing 20 times for 143 yards. This made him the first quarterback to throw for 300 yards and rush for 100 yards in a playoff game. His top receiver was Brown, who caught seven passes for 126 yards.

== League rankings ==
At the end of 2019 regular season

Category	Total yards	Yards per game	NFL rank
Passing offense	3225	201.6	27th
Rushing offense	3296*	206.0	1st
Total offense	6521	407.6	2nd
Passing defense	3315	207.2	6th
Rushing defense	1494	93.4	5th
Total defense	4809	300.6	4th

* NFL record

Power rankings Source	Week 1	Week 17	Final rank
NFL.com	11th	1st	1st
ESPN	17th	1st	1st
CBS Sports	16th	1st	1st
NBC Sports	8th	1st	1st
Sports Illustrated	17th	1st	1st
USA Today	19th	1st	1st

== Individual awards ==
External videos
- Coach Harbaugh's 2019 Coach of the Year acceptance speech, Ravens video
- Lamar Jackson's 2019 MVP acceptance speech, Ravens video

Recipient	awards
John Harbaugh	2019 NFL Coach of the Year
Greg Roman	2019 NFL Assistant Coach of the Year
Lamar Jackson	Week 1: AFC Offensive Player of the Week; Week 9: AFC Offensive Player of the Week; Week 10: AFC Offensive Player of the Week; Week 12: AFC Offensive Player of the Week; Week 15 AFC Offensive Player of the Week; November: AFC Offensive Player of the Month; Week 1: FedEx Air Player of the Week; Week 6: FedEx Ground Player of the Week; Week 10: FedEx Air Player of the Week; Week 12: FedEx Air Player of the Week; 2019: FedEx Air Player of the Year; Sporting News Offensive Player of the Year; Pro Bowl (2019); 2019 All-Pro Team; Pro Bowl Offensive MVP (2019); NFL MVP
Justin Tucker	October: AFC Special Teams Player of the Month; Week 5: AFC Special Teams Player of the Week; Week 6: AFC Special Teams Player of the Week; Pro Bowl (2019); 2019 All-Pro Team
Marlon Humphrey	Pro Bowl (2019); 2019 All-Pro Team
Marcus Peters	Pro Bowl (2019); 2019 All-Pro Team
Mark Ingram II	Pro Bowl (2019)
Mark Andrews	Pro Bowl (2019)
Earl Thomas	Pro Bowl (2019)
Marshal Yanda	Pro Bowl (2019); 2019 All-Pro Team
Matthew Judon	Pro Bowl (2019)
Patrick Ricard	Pro Bowl (2019)
Morgan Cox	Pro Bowl (2019)
Ronnie Stanley	Pro Bowl (2019); 2019 All-Pro Team
Orlando Brown Jr.	Pro Bowl (2019)
