= 2019 All-Pro Team =

Official list of the best NFL players in 2019

The 2019 All-Pro teams were named by the Associated Press (AP), Pro Football Writers of America (PFWA), and Sporting News (SN) for performance in the 2019 NFL season. While none of the All-Pro teams have the official imprimatur of the NFL (whose official recognition is nomination to the 2020 Pro Bowl), they are included in the NFL Record and Fact Book and also part of the language of the 2011 NFLPA Collective Bargaining Agreement. Any player selected to the first-team of any of the teams can be described as an "All-Pro." The AP team, with first-team and second-team selections, was chosen by a national panel of fifty NFL writers and broadcasters. The Sporting News All-NFL team was voted on by NFL players and executives. The PFWA team is selected by its more than 300 national members who are accredited media members covering the NFL.

== Teams ==
Offense
Position	First team	Second team
Quarterback	Lamar Jackson, Baltimore (AP, PFWA, SN)	Russell Wilson, Seattle (AP-2)
Running back	Christian McCaffrey, Carolina (AP, PFWA, SN); Derrick Henry, Tennessee (PFWA); Dalvin Cook, Minnesota (SN)	Derrick Henry, Tennessee (AP-2)
Flex	Christian McCaffrey, Carolina (AP)	Derrick Henry, Tennessee (AP-2)
Tight end	George Kittle, San Francisco (AP, PFWA); Travis Kelce, Kansas City (SN)	Travis Kelce, Kansas City (AP-2)
Wide receiver	Michael Thomas, New Orleans (AP, PFWA, SN); DeAndre Hopkins, Houston (AP, SN); Julio Jones, Atlanta (PFWA)	Julio Jones, Atlanta (AP-2); Chris Godwin, Tampa Bay (AP-2)
Left tackle	Ronnie Stanley, Baltimore (AP)	David Bakhtiari, Green Bay (AP-2)
Left guard	Quenton Nelson, Indianapolis (AP)	Joel Bitonio, Cleveland (AP-2t); Joe Thuney, New England (AP-2t)
Center	Jason Kelce, Philadelphia (AP, PFWA, SN)	Rodney Hudson, Oakland (AP-2)
Right guard	Zack Martin, Dallas (AP)	Marshal Yanda, Baltimore (AP-2)
Right tackle	Ryan Ramczyk, New Orleans (AP)	Mitchell Schwartz, Kansas City (AP-2)
Tackle	Laremy Tunsil, Houston (SN); David Bakhtiari, Green Bay (SN); Ryan Ramczyk, New Orleans (PFWA); Ronnie Stanley, Baltimore (PFWA)	
Guard	Quenton Nelson, Indianapolis (PFWA, SN); Marshal Yanda, Baltimore (PFWA); Zack Martin, Dallas (SN)	

Special teams
Position	First team	Second team
Kicker	Justin Tucker, Baltimore (AP, PFWA, SN)	Josh Lambo, Jacksonville (AP-2)
Punter	Brett Kern, Tennessee (AP, PFWA, SN)	Tress Way, Washington (AP-2)
Kick returner	Cordarrelle Patterson, Chicago (AP, PFWA, SN)	Mecole Hardman, Kansas City (AP-2)
Punt returner	Deonte Harris, New Orleans (AP, PFWA, SN)	Diontae Johnson, Pittsburgh (AP-2)
Special teams	Matthew Slater, New England (AP, PFWA)	Cordarrelle Patterson, Chicago (AP-2t); J. T. Gray, New Orleans (AP-2t)

Defense
Position	First team	Second team
Edge rusher	T. J. Watt, Pittsburgh (AP); Chandler Jones, Arizona (AP); Cameron Jordan, New Orleans (PFWA, SN); Joey Bosa, Los Angeles Chargers (SN); Danielle Hunter, Minnesota (PFWA)	Shaquil Barrett, Tampa Bay (AP-2); Cameron Jordan, New Orleans (AP-2)
Interior lineman	Aaron Donald, Los Angeles Rams (AP, PFWA, SN); Cameron Heyward, Pittsburgh (AP, PFWA, SN)	Grady Jarrett, Atlanta (AP-2); DeForest Buckner, San Francisco (AP-2)
Linebacker	Bobby Wagner, Seattle (AP, PFWA, SN); Demario Davis, New Orleans (AP); Eric Kendricks, Minnesota (AP); T. J. Watt, Pittsburgh (PFWA, SN); Chandler Jones, Arizona (PFWA, SN)	Luke Kuechly, Carolina (AP-2); Darius Leonard, Indianapolis (AP-2); T. J. Watt, Pittsburgh (AP-2)
Cornerback	Stephon Gilmore, New England (AP, PFWA, SN); Tre'Davious White, Buffalo (AP, PFWA, SN)	Richard Sherman, San Francisco (AP-2); Marcus Peters, Baltimore (AP-2)
Safety	Jamal Adams, New York Jets (AP, PFWA, SN); Minkah Fitzpatrick, Pittsburgh, (AP, PFWA, SN)	Justin Simmons, Denver (AP-2); Tyrann Mathieu, Kansas City (AP-2)
Defensive back	Marlon Humphrey, Baltimore (AP-t); Tyrann Mathieu, Kansas City (AP-t); Marcus Peters, Baltimore (AP-t)	

== Key ==
- AP = Associated Press first-team All-Pro
- AP-2 = Associated Press second-team All-Pro
- AP-2t = Tied for second-team All-Pro in the AP vote
- PFWA = Pro Football Writers Association All-NFL
- SN = Sporting News All-Pro

== Position differences ==
PFWA and SN did not separate the tackles and guards into more specific positions as the AP did.
