= Hayden Hurst =

American football player (born 1993)

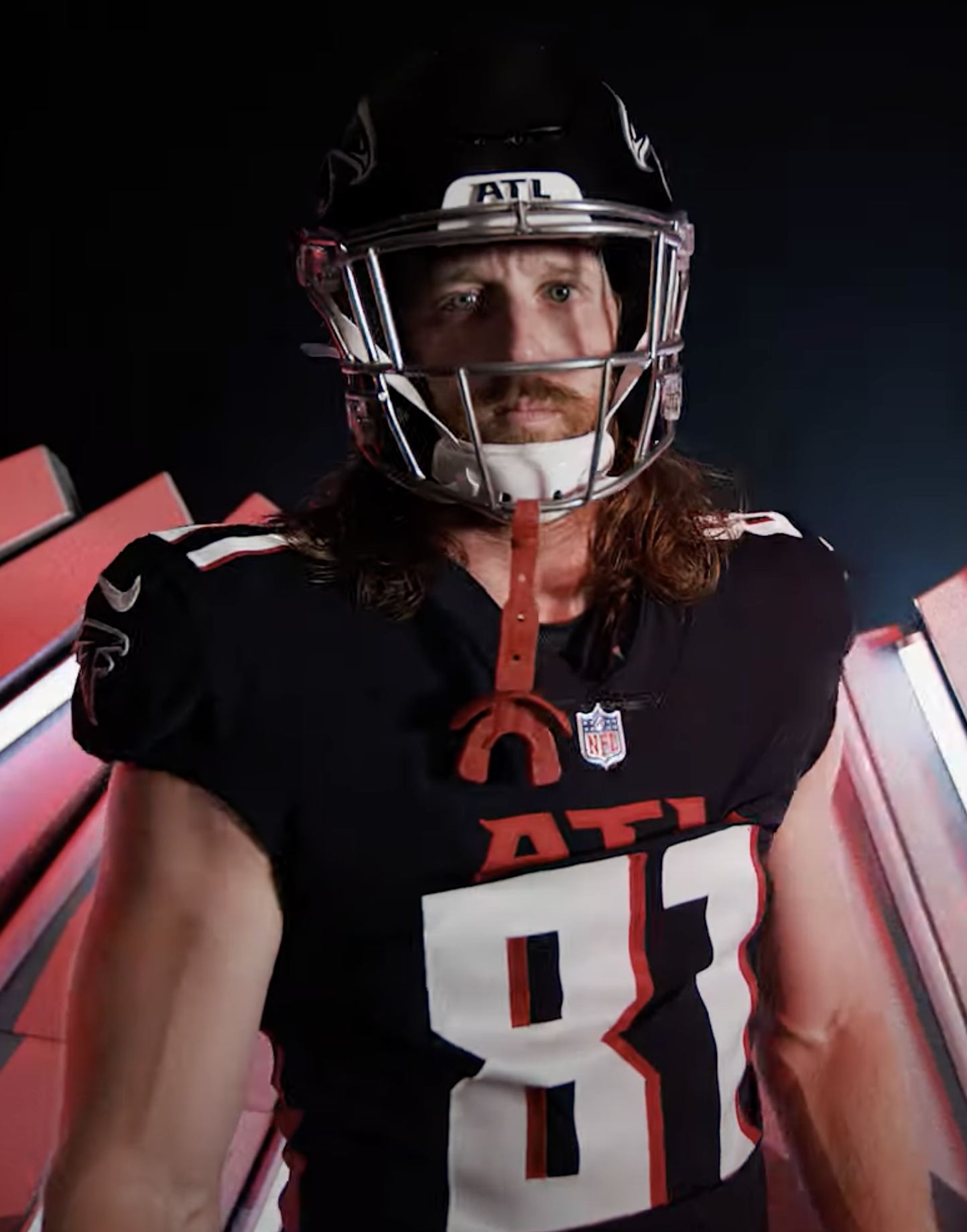
- Hurst with the Atlanta Falcons in 2021

No. 81, 88
- Position: Tight end

Personal information
- Born: August 24, 1993 (age 33); Jacksonville, Florida, U.S.
- Listed height: 6 ft 4 in (1.93 m)
- Listed weight: 245 lb (111 kg)

Career information
- High school: Bolles (Jacksonville)
- College: South Carolina (2015–2017)
- NFL draft: 2018: 1st round, 25th overall pick

Career history
- Baltimore Ravens (2018–2019); Atlanta Falcons (2020–2021); Cincinnati Bengals (2022); Carolina Panthers (2023); Los Angeles Chargers (2024)

Awards and highlights
- First-team All-SEC (2017)

Career NFL statistics
- Receptions: 203
- Receiving yards: 1,975
- Receiving touchdowns: 15
- Stats at Pro Football Reference

Hayden Randle Hurst (born August 24, 1993) is an American former professional football player who was a tight end for seven seasons in the National Football League (NFL). He played college football for the South Carolina Gamecocks and was selected by the Baltimore Ravens in the first round of the 2018 NFL draft. Hurst also played for the Atlanta Falcons, Cincinnati Bengals, Carolina Panthers, and Los Angeles Chargers.

== Early life ==
Hurst attended The Bolles School in Jacksonville, Florida. He played football and baseball for the Bulldogs athletic teams and graduated in 2012. Hurst underwent Tommy John surgery at just 14 years old after his "elbow gave out." He was teammates in high school with Austin Slater and DJ Stewart. Hurst was chosen by the Pittsburgh Pirates in the 17th round of the 2012 MLB draft and signed with the Pirates for a $400,000 signing bonus, turning down a baseball scholarship from Florida State. Hurst played two seasons in the Pirates organization before walking onto South Carolina's football team. In his only minor league pitching appearance, Hurst walked five batters and threw two wild pitches in one-third of an inning. He gave up baseball because he was afflicted by "the yips."

== College career ==
As a true freshman at the University of South Carolina in 2015, Hurst played in all 12 of the Gamecocks games, catching eight passes for 106 yards.

As a sophomore in 2016, Hurst played in all 13 games, catching at least one pass in each. He caught a career high seven passes against Kentucky. In total, Hurst caught 48 passes for 616 yards. He was awarded a scholarship the following spring.

As a junior in 2017, Hurst once again played in all 13 games (including the 2018 Outback Bowl), catching 41 passes for 567 yards and two touchdowns. He was unanimously named to the 2017 All-Southeastern Conference football team. Hurst declared for the 2018 NFL draft on December 7, 2017, nearly a month before the 2018 Outback Bowl against Michigan. Hurst recorded three receptions for 41 yards in the 2018 Outback Bowl for a 26–19 South Carolina victory over Michigan.

== Professional career ==
Pre-draft measurables
Height	Weight	Arm length	Hand span	40-yard dash	10-yard split	20-yard split	20-yard shuttle	Three-cone drill	Vertical jump	Broad jump	Bench press
6 ft 4 1/2 in (1.94 m)	250 lb (113 kg)	32 3/4 in (0.83 m)	9 3/4 in (0.25 m)	4.67 s	1.63 s	2.71 s	4.37 s	7.19 s	31 1/2 in (0.80 m)	10 ft 0 in (3.05 m)	16 reps
All values from NFL Combine

=== Baltimore Ravens ===
==== 2018 ====
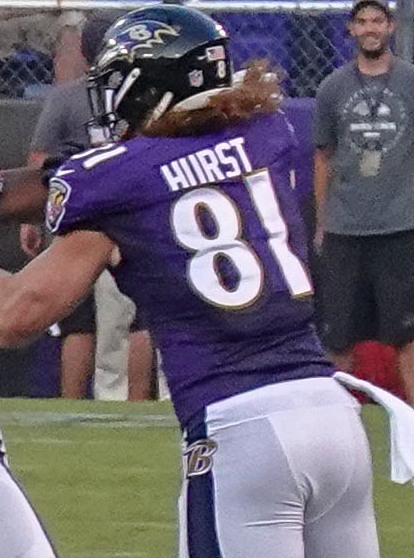
Hurst in 2018

The Baltimore Ravens selected Hurst in the first round (25th overall) of the 2018 NFL draft. He was the first tight end selected in the draft. On June 19, 2018, Hurst signed a four-year deal worth $11 million featuring a $6.1 million signing bonus.

Hurst recorded his first career touchdown reception, a 26-yard pass from fellow rookie Lamar Jackson, on October 28, 2018, late in the fourth quarter of a 21–36 loss to the Carolina Panthers.

Hurst finished his rookie year with 13 receptions for 163 yards and a touchdown in 12 games and no starts.

==== 2019 ====
On September 15, 2019, in Week 2 against the Arizona Cardinals, Hurst caught a one-yard touchdown pass from Lamar Jackson, the second of his career, as the Ravens won 23–17. In Week 14 against the Buffalo Bills, Hurst caught three passes for 73 yards, including a career-long 61-yard touchdown pass from Jackson that helped the Ravens eventually win 24–17 and clinch a playoff berth.

Hurst finished his second professional season with 30 receptions for 349 yards and two touchdowns. In the Divisional Round against the Tennessee Titans, Hurst caught four passes for 53 yards and a touchdown during the 28–12 loss.

=== Atlanta Falcons ===
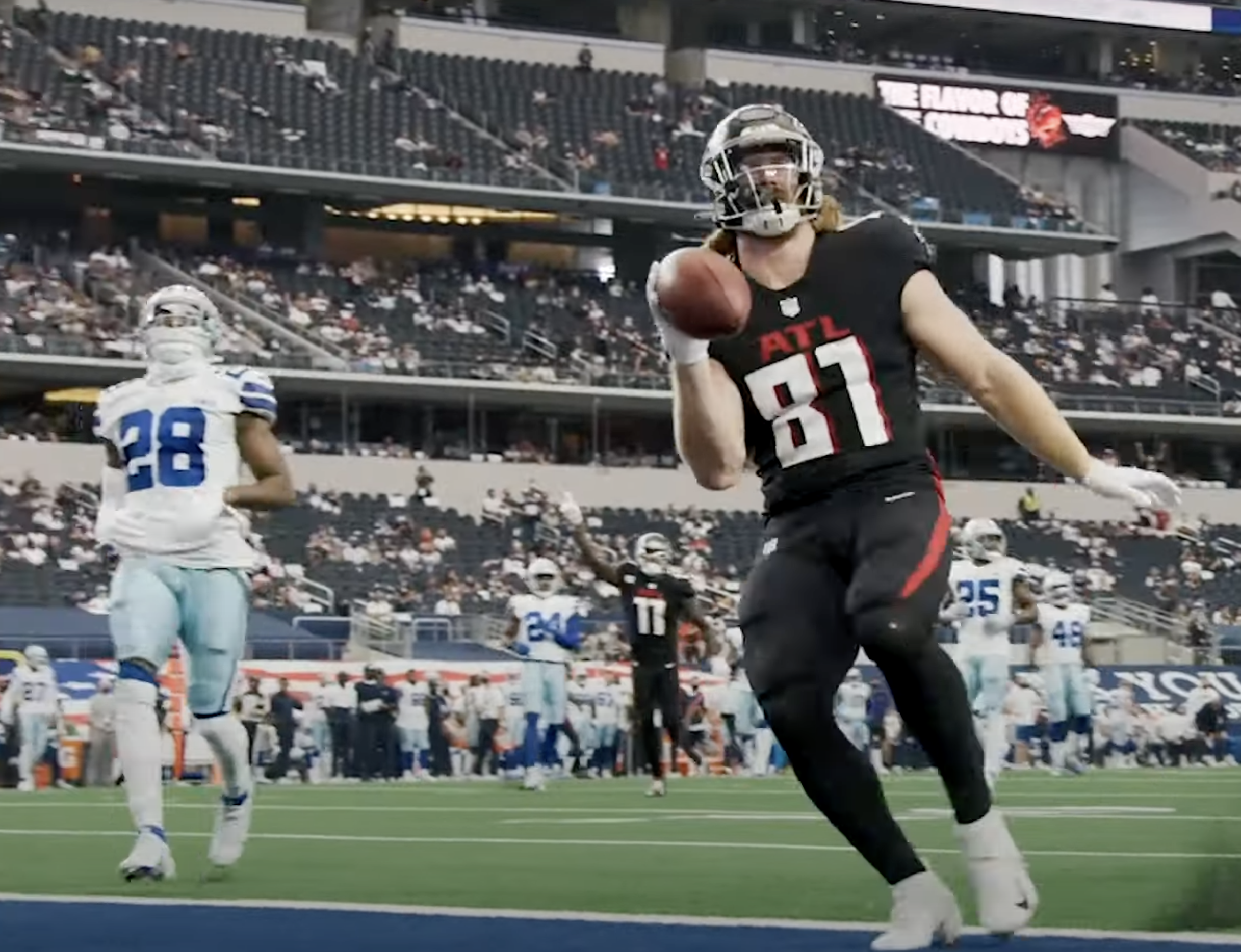
Hurst in 2020

On March 16, 2020, the Ravens agreed to trade Hurst to the Atlanta Falcons along with a fourth-round pick in the 2020 NFL draft in return for 2020 second and fifth-round picks. The deal became official on March 18. During Week 2 against the Dallas Cowboys, Hurst caught five passes for 72 yards and his first touchdown reception as a member of the Falcons in the narrow 40–39 road loss. In the 2020 season, he had 56 receptions for 571 yards and six touchdowns.

The Falcons declined to exercise the fifth-year option on Hurst's contract on May 3, 2021, making him a free agent after the 2021 season.

On November 18, 2021, Hurst was placed on injured reserve with an ankle injury. He was activated on December 11. In the 2021 season, Hurst had 26 receptions for 221 yards and three touchdowns.

=== Cincinnati Bengals ===
Hurst signed a one-year contract with the Cincinnati Bengals on March 18, 2022. He was named the Bengals starting tight end in 2022, recording 52 receptions for 414 yards and two touchdowns with 13 starts. In the Divisional Round win over the Bills, he had a receiving touchdown during the 27–10 victory.

=== Carolina Panthers ===
Hurst signed a three-year contract with the Panthers on March 15, 2023. On December 6, Hurst's father, Jerry, tweeted that Hurst was dealing with post-traumatic amnesia due to a concussion suffered in Week 10. Hurst returned to practice the same day, but was then placed on injured reserve on December 15. He finished the 2023 season with 18 receptions for 184 yards and a touchdown in nine games.

On March 13, 2024, Hurst was released by the Panthers.

=== Los Angeles Chargers ===
On March 15, 2024, Hurst signed with the Los Angeles Chargers. He appeared in nine games and had eight receptions for 73 yards in the 2024 season.

On March 9, 2026, Hurst announced his retirement from professional football.

== Career statistics ==
Legend
**Bold**	Career high

=== NFL ===
==== Regular season ====
Year	Team	Games		Receiving					
Year	Team	GP	GS	Tgt	Rec	Yds	Avg	Lng	TD
2018	BAL	12	0	23	13	163	**12.5**	32	1
2019	BAL	16	4	39	30	349	11.6	**61**	2
2020	ATL	16	9	**88**	**56**	**571**	10.2	42	**6**
2021	ATL	13	5	31	26	221	8.5	33	3
2022	CIN	13	13	68	52	414	8.0	29	2
2023	CAR	9	8	32	18	184	10.2	48	1
2024	LAC	9	0	13	8	73	9.1	27	0
Career		79	39	281	195	1,902	9.8	61	15

==== Postseason ====
Year	Team	Games		Receiving					
Year	Team	GP	GS	Tgt	Rec	Yds	Avg	Lng	TD
2018	BAL	1	0	1	0	0	0.0	0	0
2019	BAL	1	1	6	4	53	**13.3**	18	**1**
2022	CIN	3	3	**17**	**13**	**141**	10.8	**23**	**1**
2024	LAC	0	0	0	0	0	0	0	0
Career		5	4	24	17	194	11.4	23	2

=== College ===
Season	Team	GP	Receiving			
Season	Team	GP	Rec	Yds	Avg	TD
2015	South Carolina	5	8	106	**13.3**	0
2016	South Carolina	13	**48**	**616**	12.8	1
2017	South Carolina	13	44	559	12.7	**2**
Career		31	100	1,281	12.8	3
