= Ronnie Stanley =

American football player (born 1994)

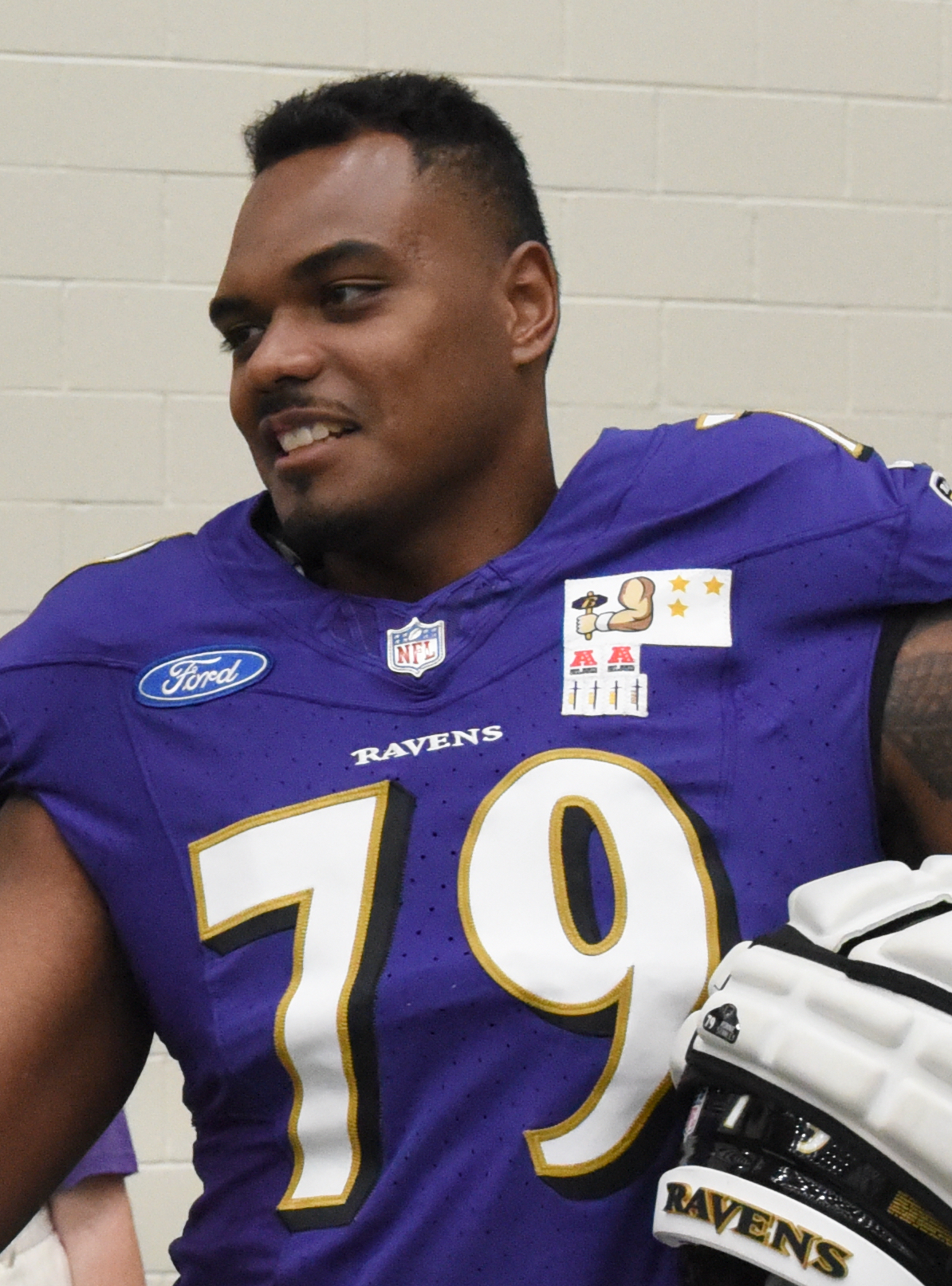
- Stanley with the Baltimore Ravens in 2023

No. 79 – Baltimore Ravens
- Position: Offensive tackle
- Roster status: Active

Personal information
- Born: March 18, 1994 (age 32); Las Vegas, Nevada, U.S.
- Listed height: 6 ft 6 in (1.98 m)
- Listed weight: 310 lb (141 kg)

Career information
- High school: Bishop Gorman (Las Vegas)
- College: Notre Dame (2012–2015)
- NFL draft: 2016: 1st round, 6th overall pick

Career history
- Baltimore Ravens (2016–present)

Awards and highlights
- First-team All-Pro (2019); 2× Pro Bowl (2019, 2024); Polynesian Professional Football Player of the Year (2019); Consensus All-American (2015); Polynesian College Football Player of the Year (2015)

Career NFL statistics as of Week 4, 2026
- Games played: 124
- Games started: 124
- Stats at Pro Football Reference

Ronnie Garrison Stanley (born March 18, 1994) is an American professional football offensive tackle for the Baltimore Ravens of the National Football League (NFL). He played college football for the Notre Dame Fighting Irish. Stanley was selected by the Ravens 6th overall in the first round of the 2016 NFL draft and earned Pro Bowl and first-team All-Pro honors in 2019.

== Early life ==
Stanley attended Bishop Gorman High School in Las Vegas, Nevada. Here, he played varsity basketball and football, with his main sport being the latter.

He was ranked by Rivals.com as a four-star recruit, and was rated as the 15th best offensive tackle prospect of his class. In December 2011, Stanley committed to the University of Notre Dame to play college football.

College recruiting
Name	Hometown	School	Height	Weight	Commit date
Ronnie Stanley; OT	Las Vegas, Nevada	Las Vegas (NV) Gorman	6 ft 5 in (1.96 m)	285 lb (129 kg)	Dec 15, 2011
Ronnie Stanley; OT	Recruit ratings: Scout: Rivals: (79)				
Overall recruit ranking: Scout: 11 (OT), 66 (national) Rivals: 1 (NV), 15 (OT), 176 (national) ESPN: 1 (NV)
Note: In many cases, Scout, Rivals, 247Sports, On3, and ESPN may conflict in their listings of height and weight.; In these cases, the average was taken. ESPN grades are on a 100-point scale.; Sources: "Notre Dame Football Commitment List". Rivals.; "Notre Dame College Football Recruiting Commits". Scout.; "ESPN". ESPN.; "Scout.com Team Recruiting Rankings". Scout.; "2012 Team Ranking". Rivals.com.

== College career ==
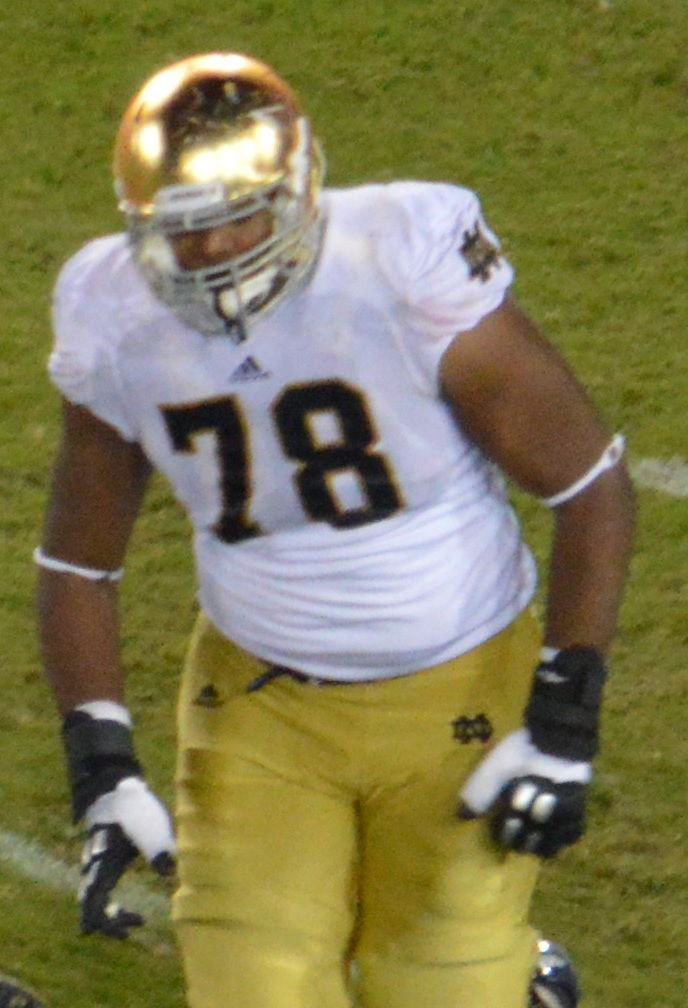
Stanley with Notre Dame in 2013

Stanley played in two games as a true freshman in 2012 in a reserve role. As a sophomore in 2013, he started all 13 games at right tackle, and was part of an offensive line that allowed just eight sacks and ranked second in the Football Bowl Subdivision in fewest sacks allowed. As a junior in 2014, he moved to left tackle, taking over for Zack Martin. He started all 13 games, allowing only just one sack all year. He contemplated entering the 2015 NFL draft, but ultimately decided to return to Notre Dame for his senior season. After his senior season, he officially announced that he would enter the 2016 NFL draft.

== Professional career ==
Pre-draft measurables
Height	Weight	Arm length	Hand span	Wingspan	40-yard dash	10-yard split	20-yard split	20-yard shuttle	Three-cone drill	Vertical jump	Bench press
6 ft 5 3/4 in (1.97 m)	312 lb (142 kg)	35 5/8 in (0.90 m)	10 5/8 in (0.27 m)	7 ft 0 1/4 in (2.14 m)	5.20 s	1.85 s	3.03 s	4.68 s	7.96 s	28.5 in (0.72 m)	24 reps
All values from NFL Combine/Pro Day

=== 2016 ===
The Baltimore Ravens selected Stanley in the first round (sixth overall) of the 2016 NFL draft. Stanley was the first offensive lineman drafted in 2016 after the unexpected draft slide of Laremy Tunsil. On May 13, 2016, the Ravens signed Stanley to a fully guaranteed, four-year, $20.48 million rookie contract, with a signing bonus of $13.09 million.

Stanley entered training camp slated as the starting left tackle after it was left vacant due to the departure of Eugene Monroe. Head coach John Harbaugh named Stanley the starting left tackle to begin the regular season. He made his professional regular season debut and first career start in the Ravens' 13–7 victory against the Buffalo Bills. Stanley sustained a foot injury and was sidelined for four games (Weeks 4–7). He started in 12 games as a rookie season in 2016 and gave up three sacks and was responsible for 22 quarterback hurries. Stanley received an overall grade of 81.1 from Pro Football Focus (PFF) in 2016 and ranked as the 17th best left tackle. He received the third highest grade among all rookie offensive tackles, behind Tennessee Titans offensive tackle Jack Conklin and Detroit Lions offensive tackle Taylor Decker.

=== 2017 ===
Stanley retained his role as the starting left tackle under new offensive coordinator Marty Mornhinweg. Head coach John Harbaugh named Stanley the starter to begin the regular season. On November 5, 2017, Stanley suffered a concussion during a 23–20 loss at the Titans in Week 9. He remained in concussion protocol and was inactive for the Ravens' Week 11 win at the Green Bay Packers. He started in 15 games in 2017 and was responsible for giving up three sacks and 23 quarterback hurries. Stanley ranked as the 13th best left tackle in 2017 and received an overall grade of 76.2 from PFF.

=== 2018 ===
Head coach John Harbaugh retained Stanley as the starting left tackle to begin the regular season in 2018. He started 15 games there, missing one due to an ankle injury.

=== 2019 ===
On April 23, 2019, the Ravens picked up the fifth-year option on Stanley's contract. Stanley continued his development blocking for quarterback Lamar Jackson and running backs Mark Ingram and Gus Edwards, which by week 15 broke Ravens scoring record set in 2014. On December 13, 2019, PFF called Stanley "The best pass blocking tackle in the NFL". On January 3, 2020, Stanley was designated a First-team All-Pro.

=== 2020 ===
On October 30, 2020, the Ravens signed Stanley to a five-year contract extension worth $112.8M in maximum total value, making him the highest paid offensive lineman in the NFL. On November 1, 2020, in a Week 8 game against the Pittsburgh Steelers, Stanley was carted off the field with a season-ending ankle injury. He was placed on injured reserve two days later.

=== 2021 ===
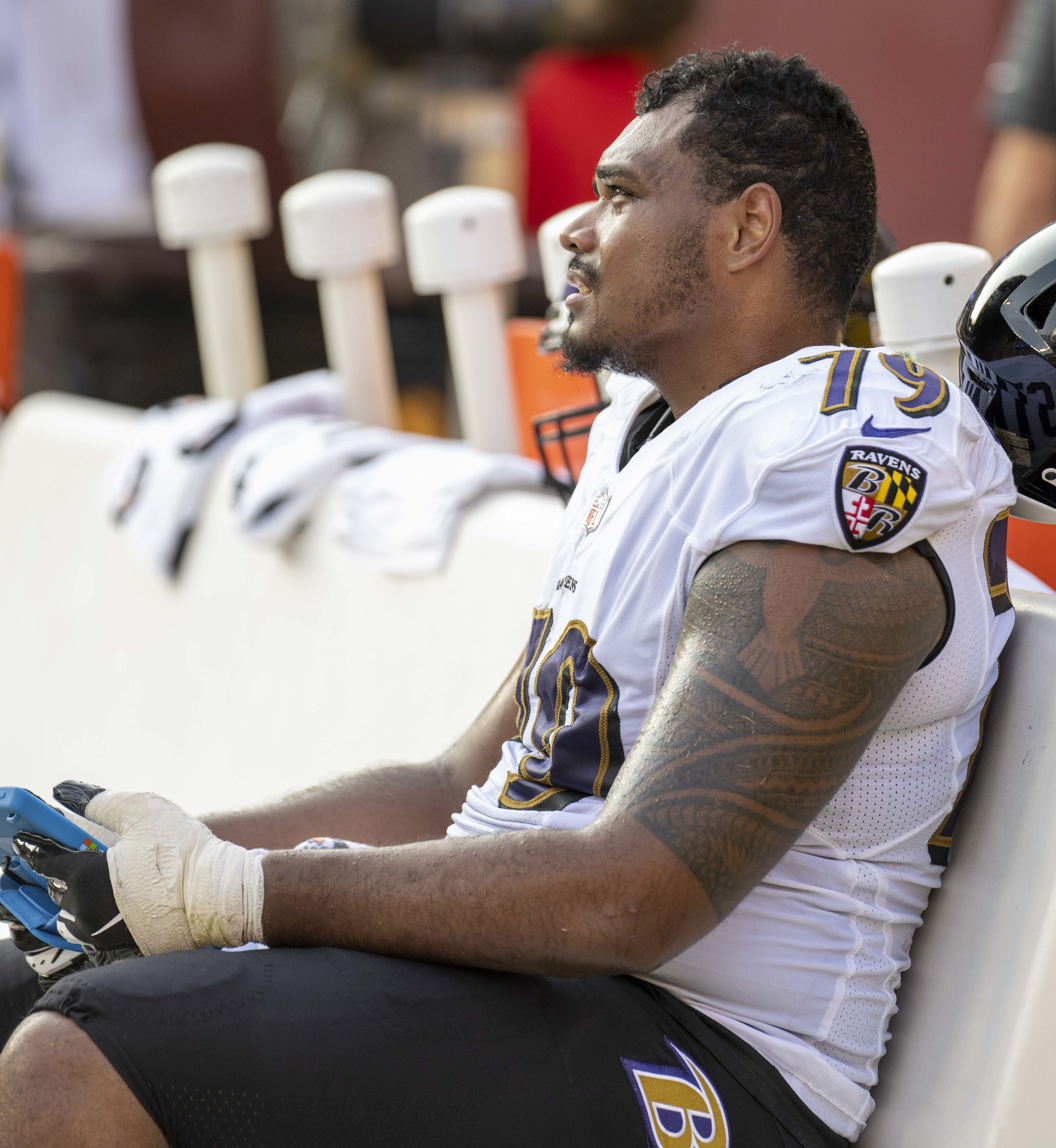
Stanley sitting on the sidelines during a preseason game in the 2021 season.

Stanley was placed on injured reserve after undergoing season-ending ankle surgery on October 19, 2021.

=== 2022 ===
Stanley returned to action and made his season debut in Week 5 against the Cincinnati Bengals.

=== 2023 ===
Despite dealing with a knee injury throughout the season, Stanley started in 13 games during the season, missing Weeks 2-4 and 11. It was the most games he had played in a regular season since his 2019 Pro Bowl year.

=== 2024 ===
In the 2024 season, Stanley played all 17 games in the regular season for the first time in his career, making his second career Pro Bowl.

=== 2025 ===
On March 9, 2025, Stanley re-signed with the Ravens on a three-year, $60 million contract.

== NFL career statistics ==
Legend
**Bold**	Career high

Year	Team	Games		Offense					
Year	Team	GP	GS	Snaps	Pct	Holding	False Start	Decl/Pen	Acpt/Pen
2016	BAL	12	12	833	**100%**	**4**	2	1	7
2017	BAL	15	15	1,009	98%	0	3	0	5
2018	BAL	15	15	1,085	96%	2	3	0	6
2019	BAL	14	14	938	96%	2	1	1	4
2020	BAL	6	6	312	78%	0	1	**2**	3
2021	BAL	1	1	68	**100%**	0	0	0	0
2022	BAL	11	11	602	85%	1	0	0	2
2023	BAL	13	13	721	84%	3	**5**	0	**11**
2024	BAL	17	17	**1,089**	98%	**4**	4	0	**11**
2025	BAL	16	16	857	88%	2	2	**2**	5
2026	BAL	4	4	252	95%	1	2	0	4
Career		124	124	7,776	–	19	23	6	58

== Personal life ==
Stanley's father is African American, and his mother is Tongan.
