= Matt Skura =

American football player (born 1993)

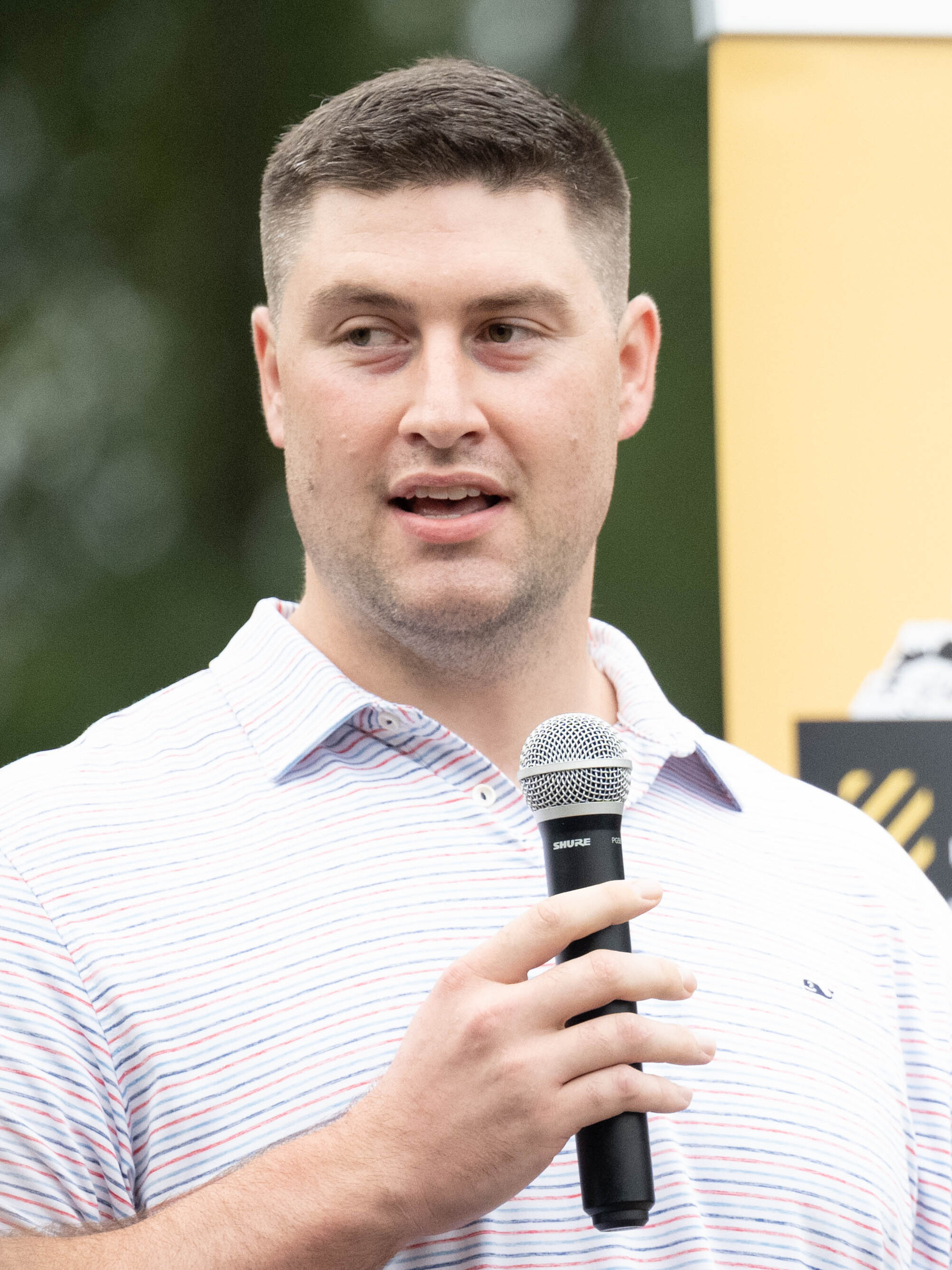
- Skura in 2024

No. 68, 67, 64
- Position: Center

Personal information
- Born: February 17, 1993 (age 33); Pittsburgh, Pennsylvania, U.S.
- Listed height: 6 ft 3 in (1.91 m)
- Listed weight: 313 lb (142 kg)

Career information
- High school: Worthington Kilbourne (Columbus, Ohio)
- College: Duke
- NFL draft: 2016: undrafted

Career history
- Baltimore Ravens (2016–2020); Miami Dolphins (2021)*; New York Giants (2021); Los Angeles Rams (2022); Miami Dolphins (2023)*
- * Offseason or practice squad member only

Awards and highlights
- First-team All-ACC (2015); Third-team All-ACC (2014)

Career NFL statistics
- Games played: 77
- Games started: 73
- Stats at Pro Football Reference

Matt Skura (born February 17, 1993) is an American former professional football player who was a center in the National Football League (NFL). He played college football for the Duke Blue Devils and signed with the Baltimore Ravens as an undrafted free agent in 2016.

== Early life ==
Skura attended Worthington Kilbourne High School in Columbus, Ohio. He was listed as the No. 13 center in the nation by ESPN.com and served as a team captain as a senior.

== College career ==
Skura served as team captain as a senior. Playing in 50 career games (40 starts), he was a two-time All-Atlantic Coast Conference selection.

== Professional career ==
Pre-draft measurables
Height	Weight	Arm length	Hand span	40-yard dash	10-yard split	20-yard split	20-yard shuttle	Three-cone drill	Vertical jump	Broad jump	Bench press
6 ft 3 3/8 in (1.91 m)	305 lb (138 kg)	33 3/8 in (0.85 m)	10 1/8 in (0.26 m)	5.28 s	1.78 s	2.96 s	4.59 s	7.83 s	26.5 in (0.67 m)	8 ft 9 in (2.67 m)	30 reps
All values from NFL Combine/Pro Day

=== Baltimore Ravens ===
Skura was signed by the Baltimore Ravens as an undrafted free agent on May 6, 2016. He was waived on September 3, 2016, and was signed to the practice squad the next day. He signed a reserve/future contract with the Ravens on January 2, 2017.

On September 2, 2017, Skura was waived by the Ravens and was later re-signed to the practice squad. He was promoted to the active roster on September 19, 2017. He started 12 games at right guard for the Ravens in 2017 in place of the injured Marshal Yanda, missing two games due to a knee injury.

After Ryan Jensen departed in free agency, Skura was named the starting center in 2018, where he started all 16 games.

In 2019, Skura started the first 11 games at center before suffering a season-ending knee injury in Week 12 against the Los Angeles Rams and was placed on injured reserve the following day. The Ravens did, however, go on to win that game, 45–6. Skura's team would go on to finish 14-2 and lose to the 6th seeded Tennessee Titans in the Divisional Round 28-12.

Skura re-signed on a one-year restricted free agent tender on April 10, 2020. He was placed on the active/physically unable to perform list at the start of training camp on August 2, 2020. He was activated on August 16, 2020. In Week 10 against the New England Patriots, Skura's snaps led to three botched quarterback-center exchanges during the 23–17 loss. He was placed on the reserve/COVID-19 list by the team on November 25, 2020, and activated on December 4.

=== Miami Dolphins (first stint) ===
On March 19, 2021, Skura signed a one-year contract with the Miami Dolphins. He was released by Miami on August 30.

=== New York Giants ===
On September 2, 2021, Skura was signed to the New York Giants' practice squad. He was promoted to the active roster on September 16. On November 3, the Giants announced that Skura was in the COVID-19 protocol. The next day, the Giants announced that Skura was cleared to return to practice.

=== Los Angeles Rams ===
On September 21, 2022, Skura signed with the practice squad of the Los Angeles Rams. He was promoted to the active roster on October 11.

=== Miami Dolphins (second stint) ===
On December 13, 2023, Skura was signed to the Miami Dolphins' practice squad. He was not signed to a reserve/future contract after the season and thus became a free agent upon the expiration of his practice squad contract.

On November 20, 2024, Skura announced his retirement from professional football.
