= Marshal Yanda =

American football player (born 1984)

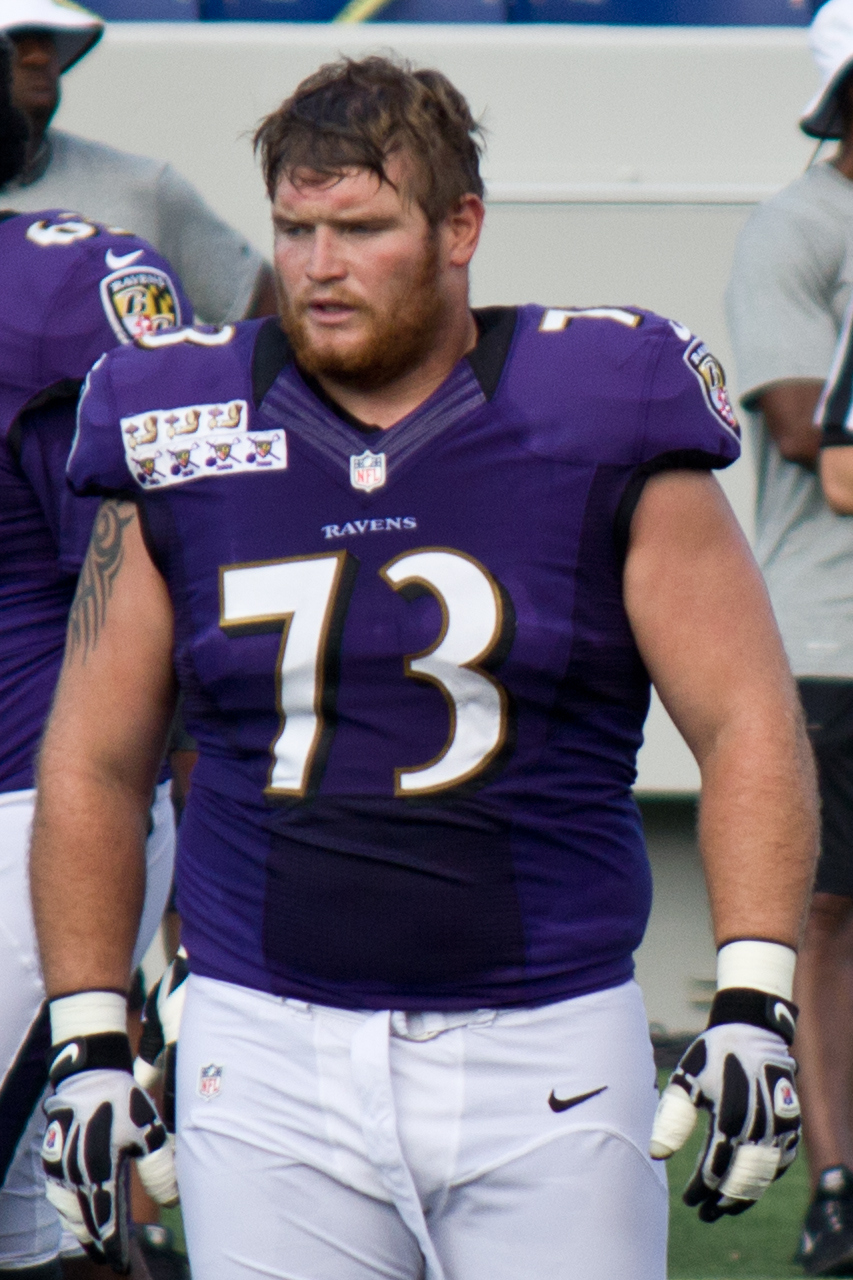
- Yanda with the Baltimore Ravens in 2012

No. 73
- Position: Guard

Personal information
- Born: September 15, 1984 (age 42); Cedar Rapids, Iowa, U.S.
- Listed height: 6 ft 3 in (1.91 m)
- Listed weight: 305 lb (138 kg)

Career information
- High school: Anamosa (Anamosa, Iowa)
- College: North Iowa Area (2003–2004); Iowa (2005–2006)
- NFL draft: 2007: 3rd round, 86th overall pick

Career history
- Baltimore Ravens (2007–2019)

Awards and highlights
- Super Bowl champion (XLVII); 2× First-team All-Pro (2014, 2015); 5× Second-team All-Pro (2011, 2012, 2016, 2018, 2019); 8× Pro Bowl (2011–2016, 2018–2019); NFL 2010s All-Decade Team; PFWA All-Rookie Team (2007); Baltimore Ravens Ring of Honor; Second-team All-Big Ten (2006)

Career NFL statistics
- Games played: 177
- Games started: 166
- Fumble recoveries: 8
- Stats at Pro Football Reference

Marshal John Yanda (born September 15, 1984) is an American former professional football player who spent his entire 13-year career as a guard for the Baltimore Ravens of the National Football League (NFL). He played college football for the Iowa Hawkeyes, and was selected by the Ravens in the third round of the 2007 NFL draft.

With six consecutive Pro Bowl selections from 2011 to 2016 (the longest active streak amongst guards at the time), Yanda was widely considered to be among the best offensive linemen in football. He was also a unanimous selection to the NFL 2010s All-Decade Team. Yanda missed most of the 2017 season due to injury, but was elected to the Pro Bowl again in 2018 and 2019 before announcing his retirement in March 2020.

== Early life ==
Yanda attended Anamosa High School in Iowa and was a letterman in football, basketball, and track & field. In football, he was a two-time first-team all-conference selection.

== College career ==
Yanda played for the Iowa Hawkeyes football team while attending the University of Iowa, where he was an economics major. Yanda was selected as a third-team All-American by The NFL Draft Report in 2006 and earned second-team All-Big Ten honors from the league's coaches in recognition of his contributions on the field. Yanda's first two college football seasons were played for North Iowa Area Community College. He was inducted into the Senior Bowl Hall of Fame on June 25, 2023.

== Professional career ==
Pre-draft measurables
Height	Weight	40-yard dash	10-yard split	20-yard split	20-yard shuttle	Three-cone drill	Vertical jump	Broad jump	Bench press
6 ft 3 7/8 in (1.93 m)	307 lb (139 kg)	5.15 s	1.69 s	2.88 s	4.58 s	7.36 s	27 in (0.69 m)	8 ft 5 in (2.57 m)	23 reps
Measurables from NFL Combine/Drills from Pro Day

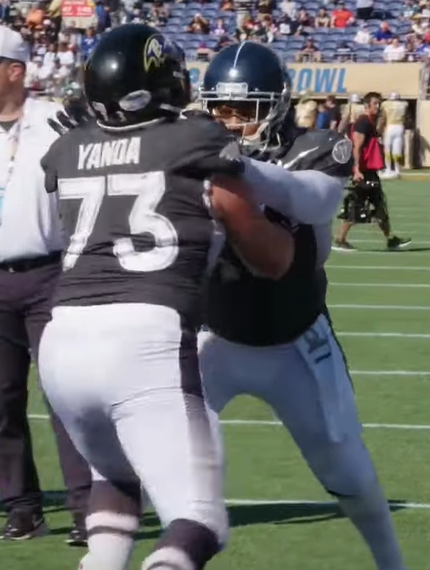
Yanda at the 2020 Pro Bowl

The Baltimore Ravens selected Yanda in the third round (86th overall) of the 2007 NFL draft. He was the seventh offensive tackle drafted in 2007.

On July 11, 2007, the Ravens signed Yanda to a three-year, $1.61 million contract with $502,698 guaranteed.

As a rookie in 2007, Yanda played all 16 games with 12 starts. In 2008, Yanda was limited to five starts. In 2009, Yanda played all 16 games with nine starts. In 2010, Yanda started all 16 games for the first time of his career.

On July 26, 2011, the Ravens re-signed Yanda to a five-year, $32 million contract. In 2011, Yanda again started all 16 games and was chosen to represent the AFC in the 2011 Pro Bowl. In 2012, Yanda started 14 games and won his first championship ring as the Ravens won Super Bowl XLVII against the San Francisco 49ers. In the 2013 and 2014 seasons, Yanda played all 16 games each season.

On October 16, 2015, the Ravens signed Yanda to a four-year contract extension worth $32 million.

Yanda was consecutively named as the top-ranked guard by Pro Football Focus in 2014, 2015, and 2016. He was ranked 37th by his fellow players on the NFL Top 100 Players of 2016.

Yanda was named to his sixth straight Pro Bowl in recognition of his accomplishments in the 2016 season. He was also ranked 43rd by his peers on the NFL Top 100 Players of 2017.

Yanda broke his ankle during a game on September 17, 2017, which prematurely ended his season.

On December 18, 2018, Yanda was named to his seventh Pro Bowl after missing out last year, due to his injury. He was also named second-team All-Pro for the fourth time in his career after starting all 16 games.

On April 11, 2019, Yanda signed a one-year contract extension with the Ravens through the 2020 season.

On March 10, 2020, Yanda announced his retirement from the NFL after 13 seasons.

=== Regular season ===
Legend
	Won the Super Bowl
**Bold**	Career high

Year	Team	Games		Offense				
Year	Team	GP	GS	Snaps	Holding	False Start	Decl/Pen	Acpt/Pen
2007	BAL	16	12	844	2	3	1	5
2008	BAL	5	5	339	0	1	1	1
2009	BAL	16	9	585	2	1	0	4
2010	BAL	16	16	1,055	0	4	**2**	4
2011	BAL	16	16	1,039	0	2	0	3
2012	BAL	14	14	912	**3**	3	1	6
2013	BAL	16	16	1,136	1	**5**	0	**7**
2014	BAL	16	16	1,062	0	4	1	4
2015	BAL	16	16	1,132	0	2	1	3
2016	BAL	13	13	898	2	1	0	3
2017	BAL	2	2	102	0	0	0	0
2018	BAL	16	16	**1,163**	1	1	1	2
2019	BAL	15	15	969	0	1	0	1
Career		177	166	11,236	11	28	7	43

== Personal life ==
Yanda married Shannon Hunt Yanda in 2011. They have three children and spend the NFL offseason in Marion, Iowa.
