= 2016 Baltimore Ravens season =

NFL team season

- Owner: Steve Bisciotti
- General manager: Ozzie Newsome
- Head coach: John Harbaugh
- Offensive coordinator: Marc Trestman (fired Oct 10); Marty Mornhinweg (interim)
- Defensive coordinator: Dean Pees
- Home stadium: M&T Bank Stadium

Results
- Record: 8–8
- Division place: 2nd AFC North
- Playoffs: Did not qualify
- All-Pros: 4: K Justin Tucker (1st team); LG Marshal Yanda (2nd team); LB C. J. Mosley (2nd team); LB Zach Orr (2nd team)
- Pro Bowlers: 7: FB Kyle Juszczyk; G Marshal Yanda; C Jeremy Zuttah; MLB C. J. Mosley; FS Eric Weddle; K Justin Tucker; LS Morgan Cox

Uniform
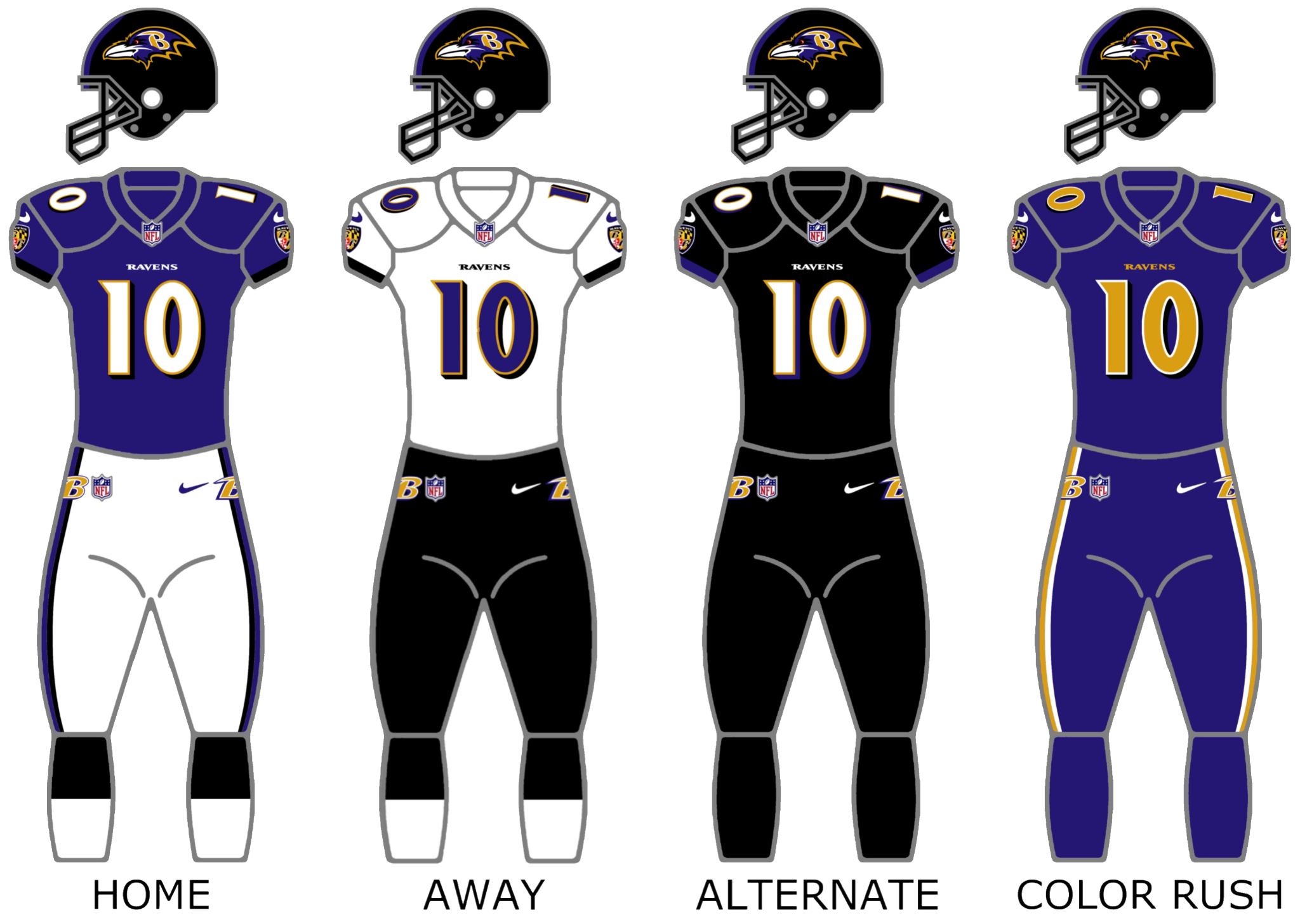

The 2016 season was the Baltimore Ravens' 21st in the National Football League (NFL) and their ninth under head coach John Harbaugh. With a week 12 win over the Cincinnati Bengals, the Ravens improved upon their 5–11 record from 2015, finishing the season 8–8. Despite the improvement, the Ravens failed to qualify for the playoffs for the second consecutive year after losing to the Pittsburgh Steelers on Christmas Day in Week 16. It was the first time the Ravens missed the playoffs in consecutive seasons since 2004–2005, and their first consecutive non-winning seasons since 1996–1999. They did, however, improve their position in the division, finishing in second place after finishing in third place for the previous three seasons. The Ravens drafted Ronnie Stanley with the 6th overall pick, making him the second-highest draft pick a John Harbaugh-coached team has had. He later drafted Arvell Reese 5th overall in 2026 after being hired by the New York Giants.

== Draft ==
2016 Baltimore Ravens draft
Round	Pick	Player	Position	College	Notes
1	6	Ronnie Stanley *	OT	Notre Dame	
2	36	Kamalei Correa	OLB	Boise State	
3	70	Bronson Kaufusi	DE	BYU	
4	104	Tavon Young	CB	Temple	
4	107	Chris Moore	WR	Cincinnati	
4	130	Alex Lewis	OT	Nebraska	
4	132	Willie Henry	DT	Michigan	
4	134	Kenneth Dixon	RB	Louisiana Tech	
5	146	Matthew Judon *	DE	Grand Valley State	
6	182	Keenan Reynolds	WR	Navy	
6	209	Maurice Canady	CB	Virginia	
Made roster † Pro Football Hall of Fame * Made at least one Pro Bowl during career

Notes

- The Ravens traded their fifth-round selection and center Gino Gradkowski to the Denver Broncos in exchange for the Broncos' fourth-round selection. However, Gradkowski was released by the Broncos prior to the 2015 season.
- The Ravens traded their seventh-round selection to the Miami Dolphins in exchange for cornerback Will Davis.
- The Ravens received two fourth-round and a sixth-round compensatory pick (Nos. 132, 134, and 209 respectively) as the result of a negative differential of free agent signings and departures that the Ravens experienced during the 2015 free agency period.

== Staff ==
2016 Baltimore Ravens staff
Front office: Owner – Steve Bisciotti; President – Dick Cass; Executive vice president/general manager – Ozzie Newsome; Assistant general manager – Eric DeCosta; Senior vice president of football administration – Pat Moriarty; Director of pro personnel – Vince Newsome; Director of college scouting – Joe Hortiz; Director of football administration – Jessica Markison; Senior personnel assistant – George Kokinis; Assistant director of pro personnel – Chad Alexander; Head coaches: Head coach – John Harbaugh; Assistant to the head coach – Dan Parsons; Offensive coaches: Offensive coordinator – Marc Trestman; Quarterbacks – Marty Mornhinweg; Running backs – Thomas Hammock; Wide receivers – Bobby Engram; Tight ends – Richard Angulo; Offensive line – Juan Castillo; Assistant offensive line – Todd Washington; Senior offensive assistant – Craig Ver Steeg; Offensive assistant – Andy Bischoff; Offensive assistant – Matt Weiss	Defensive coaches: Defensive coordinator – Dean Pees; Defensive line – Joe Cullen; Linebackers – Don Martindale; Defensive backs – Chris Hewitt; Secondary – Leslie Frazier; Senior defensive assistant – Clarence Brooks; Defensive assistant – Mike Macdonald; Defensive coaching assistant – Drew Wilkins; Special teams coaches: Associate head coach/special teams coordinator – Jerry Rosburg; Assistant special teams – Chris Horton; Kicking consultant – Randy Brown; Strength and conditioning: Strength and conditioning – Bob Rogucki; Assistant strength and conditioning – Juney Barnett; Director of performance and recovery – Steve Saunders

== Final roster ==
2016 Baltimore Ravens roster
Quarterbacks (QB): 5 Joe Flacco; 15 Ryan Mallett; Running backs (RB): 37 Javorius Allen; 30 Kenneth Dixon; 44 Kyle Juszczyk FB; 28 Terrance West; Wide receivers (WR): 11 Kamar Aiken; 12 Michael Campanaro; 16 Vince Mayle; 10 Chris Moore; 18 Breshad Perriman; 81 Keenan Reynolds; 89 Steve Smith Sr.; 17 Mike Wallace; Tight ends (TE): 86 Nick Boyle; 80 Crockett Gillmore; 88 Dennis Pitta; 84 Darren Waller	Offensive linemen (OL): 62 Vladimir Ducasse G; 74 James Hurst T; 66 Ryan Jensen G; 72 Alex Lewis T; 79 Ronnie Stanley T; 64 John Urschel G; 71 Rick Wagner T; 73 Marshal Yanda G; 53 Jeremy Zuttah C; Defensive linemen (DL): 93 Lawrence Guy DE; 99 Timmy Jernigan DE; 78 Michael Pierce NT; 96 Brent Urban DE; 98 Brandon Williams NT	Linebackers (LB): 45 Brennen Beyer OLB; 58 Elvis Dumervil OLB; 91 Matthew Judon OLB; 59 Lamar Louis ILB; 50 Albert McClellan OLB; 57 C. J. Mosley ILB; 48 Patrick Onwuasor ILB; 90 Za'Darius Smith OLB; 55 Terrell Suggs OLB; Defensive backs (DB): 33 Matt Elam SS; 42 Marqueston Huff FS; 41 Anthony Levine SS; 31 Chris Lewis-Harris CB; 26 Jerraud Powers CB; 21 Lardarius Webb FS; 32 Eric Weddle SS; 24 Shareece Wright CB; 36 Tavon Young CB; Special teams (ST): 46 Morgan Cox LS; 4 Sam Koch P; 9 Justin Tucker K	Practice squad: 85 Kenny Bell WR; 29 Sam Brown CB; 61 Jarell Broxton G; 40 Robertson Daniel CB; 43 Stephen Houston RB; 95 Kapron Lewis-Moore DE; 63 Jarrod Pughsley G; 68 Matt Skura C; 2 Dustin Vaughan QB; Reserve: 35 Kyle Arrington CB (IR); 39 Maurice Canady CB (IR); 51 Kamalei Correa ILB (IR); 94 Carl Davis NT (IR); 69 Willie Henry DE (IR); 92 Bronson Kaufusi OLB (IR); 23 Kendrick Lewis FS (IR); 49 Cavellis Luckett ILB (IR); 13 Chris Matthews WR (IR); 67 Stephane Nembot T (IR); 54 Zach Orr ILB (IR); 27 Sheldon Price CB (IR); 38 Jumal Rolle CB (IR); 22 Jimmy Smith CB (IR); 34 Lorenzo Taliaferro RB (IR); 82 Ben Watson TE (IR); 77 De'Ondre Wesley T (IR); 87 Maxx Williams TE (IR); Rookies in italics 53 active, 18 reserve, 9 practice squad

== Preseason ==
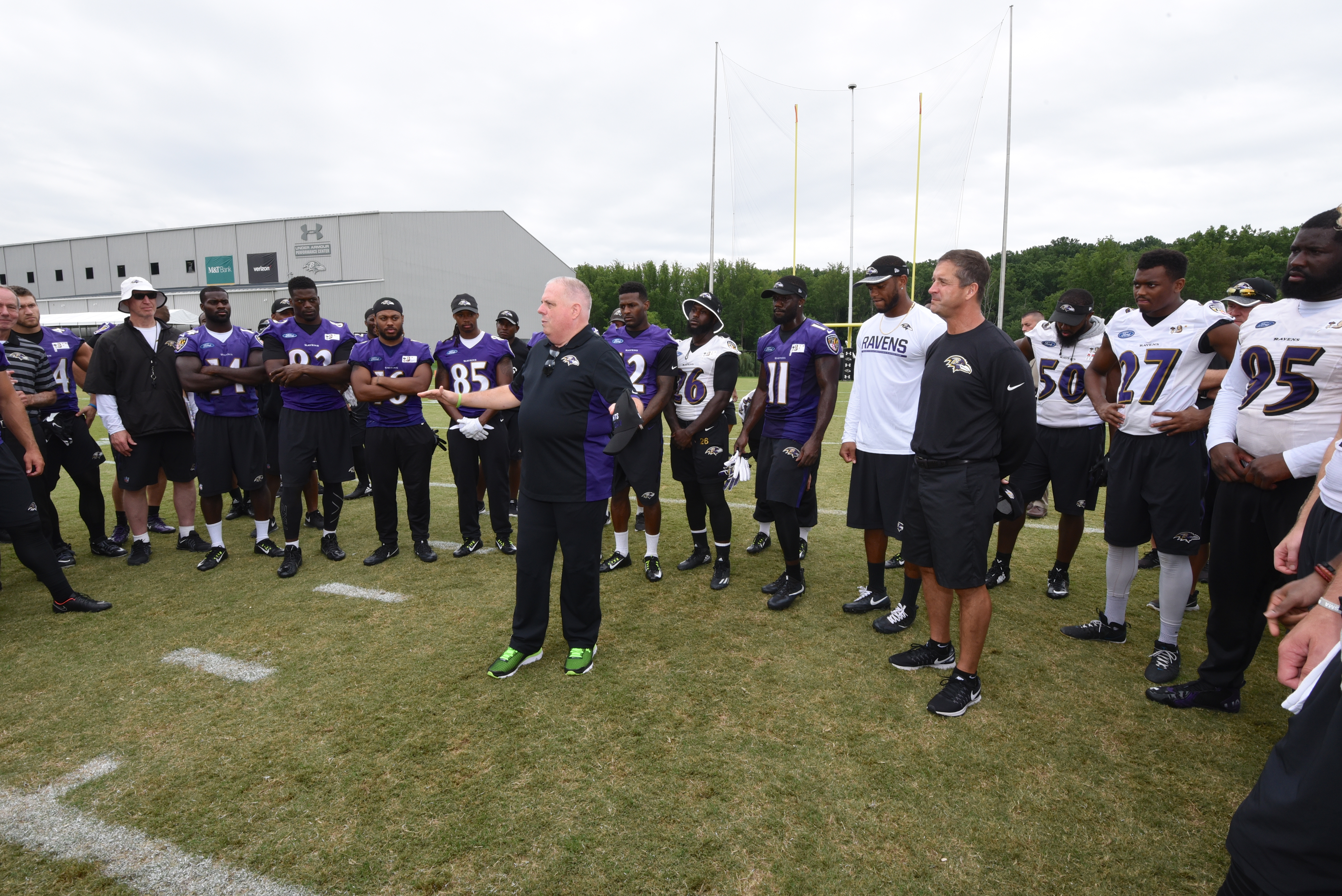
Ravens at training camp

Week	Date	Opponent	Result	Record	Venue	Recap
1	August 11	Carolina Panthers	W 22–19	1–0	M&T Bank Stadium	Recap
2	August 20	at Indianapolis Colts	W 19–18	2–0	Lucas Oil Stadium	Recap
3	August 27	Detroit Lions	W 30–9	3–0	M&T Bank Stadium	Recap
4	September 1	at New Orleans Saints	W 23–14	4–0	Mercedes-Benz Superdome	Recap

== Regular season ==
=== Schedule ===
Week	Date	Opponent	Result	Record	Venue	Recap
1	September 11	Buffalo Bills	**W** 13–7	1–0	M&T Bank Stadium	Recap
2	September 18	at **Cleveland Browns**	**W** 25–20	2–0	FirstEnergy Stadium	Recap
3	September 25	at Jacksonville Jaguars	**W** 19–17	3–0	EverBank Field	Recap
4	October 2	Oakland Raiders	**L** 27–28	3–1	M&T Bank Stadium	Recap
5	October 9	Washington Redskins	**L** 10–16	3–2	M&T Bank Stadium	Recap
6	October 16	at New York Giants	**L** 23–27	3–3	MetLife Stadium	Recap
7	October 23	at New York Jets	**L** 16–24	3–4	MetLife Stadium	Recap
8	Bye					
9	November 6	**Pittsburgh Steelers**	**W** 21–14	4–4	M&T Bank Stadium	Recap
10	November 10	**Cleveland Browns**	**W** 28–7	5–4	M&T Bank Stadium	Recap
11	November 20	at Dallas Cowboys	**L** 17–27	5–5	AT&T Stadium	Recap
12	November 27	**Cincinnati Bengals**	**W** 19–14	6–5	M&T Bank Stadium	Recap
13	December 4	Miami Dolphins	**W** 38–6	7–5	M&T Bank Stadium	Recap
14	December 12	at New England Patriots	**L** 23–30	7–6	Gillette Stadium	Recap
15	December 18	Philadelphia Eagles	**W** 27–26	8–6	M&T Bank Stadium	Recap
16	December 25	at **Pittsburgh Steelers**	**L** 27–31	8–7	Heinz Field	Recap
17	January 1	at **Cincinnati Bengals**	**L** 10–27	8–8	Paul Brown Stadium	Recap

Note: Intra-division opponents are in bold text.

=== Game summaries ===
==== Week 1: Baltimore Ravens 13, Buffalo Bills 7 ====
Week One: Buffalo Bills at Baltimore Ravens – Game summary

Quarter	1	2	3	4	Total
Bills	0	7	0	0	**7**
**Ravens**	3	7	0	3	**13**

at M&T Bank Stadium, Baltimore, Maryland

- Date: September 11
- Game time: 1:00 p.m. EDT
- Game weather: 84 °F (29 °C), partly cloudy
- Game attendance: 71,104
- Referee: Brad Allen
- TV announcers (CBS): Spero Dedes, Solomon Wilcots and Dana Jacobson
- Recap, Gamebook

Game information

**First quarter**

- BAL – Justin Tucker 50-yard field goal, 0:35. Ravens 3–0. **Drive: 9 plays, 59 yards, 4:47.**

**Second quarter**

- BAL – Mike Wallace 66-yard pass from Joe Flacco (Justin Tucker kick), 10:11. Ravens 10–0. **Drive: 6 plays, 85 yards, 2:48.**
- BUF – LeSean McCoy 1-yard run (Dan Carpenter kick), 3:02. Ravens 10–7. **Drive: 12 plays, 75 yards, 7:09.**

**Third quarter**

- No scoring plays

**Fourth quarter**

- BAL – Justin Tucker 37-yard field goal, 5:39. Ravens 13–7. **Drive: 13 plays, 59 yards, 5:59.**

**Top passers**

- BUF – Tyrod Taylor – 15/22, 111 yards
- BAL – Joe Flacco – 23/34, 258 yards, TD

**Top rushers**

- BUF – LeSean McCoy – 13 rushes, 58 yards, TD
- BAL – Justin Forsett – 10 rushes, 41 yards

**Top receivers**

- BUF – Sammy Watkins – 4 receptions, 43 yards
- BAL – Mike Wallace – 3 receptions, 91 yards, TD

The Ravens started the season with the return of their injured starters from last season. While the offense played a fairly average game, the defense was dominant, holding former teammate Tyrod Taylor and the Bills offense to only 160 total yards. The team looked overall much better than last season, with no major injuries and few penalties (6 for 35 yards).

==== Week 2: Baltimore Ravens 25, Cleveland Browns 20 ====
Week Two: Baltimore Ravens at Cleveland Browns – Game summary

Quarter	1	2	3	4	Total
**Ravens**	2	10	7	6	**25**
Browns	20	0	0	0	**20**

at FirstEnergy Stadium, Cleveland, Ohio

- Date: September 18
- Game time: 1:00 pm. EDT
- Game weather: 74 °F (23 °C), sunny
- Game attendance: 67,431
- Referee: John Hussey
- TV announcers (CBS): Carter Blackburn, Chris Simms and Jenny Dell
- Recap, Gamebook

Game information

**First quarter**

- CLE – Corey Coleman 31-yard pass from Josh McCown (Patrick Murray kick), 9:45. Browns 7–0. **Drive: 9 plays, 75 yards, 5:15.**
- CLE – Isaiah Crowell 85-yard run (Patrick Murray kick), 6:47. Browns 14–0. **Drive: 1 play, 85 yards, 0:11.**
- CLE – Corey Coleman 11-yard pass from Josh McCown, 4:34. Browns 20–0. **Drive: 4 plays, 27 yards, 1:25.**
- BAL – Tavon Young defensive two-point conversion, 4:34. Browns 20–2.

**Second quarter**

- BAL – Mike Wallace 7-yard pass from Joe Flacco (Justin Tucker kick), 1:15. Browns 20–9. **Drive: 6 plays, 75 yards, 1:59.**
- BAL – Justin Tucker 52-yard field goal, 0:00. Browns 20–12. **Drive: 7 plays, 27 yards, 0:42.**

**Third quarter**

- BAL – Mike Wallace 17-yard pass from Joe Flacco (Justin Tucker kick), 12:17. Browns 20–19. **Drive: 6 plays, 75 yards, 2:43.**

**Fourth quarter**

- BAL – Justin Tucker 49-yard field goal, 11:19. Ravens 22–20. **Drive: 5 plays, 27 yards, 2:35.**
- BAL – Justin Tucker 41-yard field goal, 2:53. Ravens 25–20. **Drive: 11 plays, 41 yards, 5:08.**

**Top passers**

- BAL – Joe Flacco – 24/45, 302 yards, 2 TD, 2 INT
- CLE – Josh McCown – 20/33, 260 yards, 2 TD, 2 INT

**Top rushers**

- BAL – Terrance West – 11 rushes, 42 yards
- CLE – Isaiah Crowell – 18 rushes, 133 yards, TD

**Top receivers**

- BAL – Dennis Pitta – 9 receptions, 102 yards
- CLE – Corey Coleman – 5 receptions, 104 yards, 2 TD

The Ravens traveled to their division rival Cleveland Browns for their road opener. After Browns' starting quarterback Robert Griffin III was injured in week 1, the Ravens faced Josh McCown who passed for 457 yards against them last season. After a dismal start in which the defense allowed 20 points in the first quarter, they bounced back with a blocked extra point for a safety, after which Joe Flacco and the offense finally returned with full strength, with two touchdown passes to Mike Wallace and three Justin Tucker field goals, shutting out the Browns 25–0 in the final three-quarters.

==== Week 3: Baltimore Ravens 19, Jacksonville Jaguars 17 ====
Week Three: Baltimore Ravens at Jacksonville Jaguars – Game summary

Quarter	1	2	3	4	Total
**Ravens**	7	6	3	3	**19**
Jaguars	0	7	7	3	**17**

at EverBank Field, Jacksonville, Florida

- Date: September 25
- Game time: 1:00 pm. EDT
- Game weather: 87 °F (31 °C), cloudy
- Game attendance: 60,127
- Referee: Gene Steratore
- TV announcers (CBS): Tom McCarthy, Adam Archuleta and Chris Fischer
- Recap, Gamebook

Game information

**First quarter**

- BAL – Joe Flacco 7-yard run (Justin Tucker kick), 3:52. Ravens 7–0. **Drive: 8 plays, 75 yards, 4:03.**

**Second quarter**

- BAL – Justin Tucker 43-yard field goal, 11:07. Ravens 10–0. **Drive: 10 plays, 46 yards, 5:47.**
- JAX – Allen Robinson 3-yard pass from Blake Bortles (Jason Myers kick), 1:55. Ravens 10–7. **Drive: 8 plays, 37 yards, 3:50.**
- BAL – Justin Tucker 42-yard field goal, 0:00. Ravens 13–7. **Drive: 8 plays, 51 yards, 1:55.**

**Third quarter**

- BAL – Justin Tucker 37-yard field goal, 10:21. Ravens 16–7. **Drive: 9 plays, 56 yards, 4:39.**
- JAX – Allen Robinson 12-yard pass from Blake Bortles (Jason Myers kick), 4:59. Ravens 16–14. **Drive: 11 plays, 78 yards, 5:22.**

**Fourth quarter**

- JAX – Jason Myers 45-yard field goal, 7:27. Jaguars 17–16. **Drive: 4 plays, 8 yards, 1:34.**
- BAL – Justin Tucker 53-yard field goal, 1:02. Ravens 19–17. **Drive: 8 plays, 22 yards, 1:57.**

**Top passers**

- BAL – Joe Flacco – 29/40, 214 yards, 2 INT
- JAX – Blake Bortles – 24/38, 194 yards, 2 TD, 3 INT

**Top rushers**

- BAL – Terrance West – 10 rushes, 45 yards
- JAX – Blake Bortles – 3 rushes, 17 yards

**Top receivers**

- BAL – Steve Smith Sr. – 8 receptions, 87 yards
- JAX – Allen Robinson – 7 receptions, 57 yards, 2 TD

With the win, the Ravens improved to 3–0 and sat on top of the division with the Steelers' loss to the Eagles.

==== Week 4: Oakland Raiders 28, Baltimore Ravens 27 ====
Week Four: Oakland Raiders at Baltimore Ravens – Game summary

Quarter	1	2	3	4	Total
**Raiders**	7	7	0	14	**28**
Ravens	0	6	6	15	**27**

at M&T Bank Stadium, Baltimore, Maryland

- Date: October 2
- Game time: 1:00 pm. EDT
- Game weather: 65 °F (18 °C), cloudy
- Game attendance: 71,152
- Referee: Ed Hochuli
- TV announcers (CBS): Andrew Catalon, Steve Beuerlein, Steve Tasker and Chris Fischer
- Recap, Gamebook

Game information

**First quarter**

- OAK – Seth Roberts 6-yard pass from Derek Carr (Sebastian Janikowski kick), 1:25. Raiders 7–0. **Drive: 1 play, 6 yards, 0:07.**

**Second quarter**

- BAL – Justin Tucker 24-yard field goal, 12:51. Raiders 7–3. **Drive: 9 plays, 42 yards, 3:34.**
- OAK – Michael Crabtree 5-yard pass from Derek Carr (Sebastian Janikowski kick), 4:09. Raiders 14–3. **Drive: 9 plays, 80 yards, 4:00.**
- BAL – Justin Tucker 43-yard field goal, 0:03. Raiders 14–6. **Drive: 10 plays, 63 yards, 1:34.**

**Third quarter**

- BAL – Joe Flacco 1-yard run (pass failed), 2:41. Raiders 14–12. **Drive: 13 plays, 72 yards, 7:00.**

**Fourth quarter**

- OAK – Michael Crabtree 13-yard pass from Derek Carr (Sebastian Janikowski kick), 11:11. Raiders 21–12. **Drive: 6 plays, 29 yards, 3:37.**
- BAL – Steve Smith Sr. 52-yard pass from Joe Flacco (Justin Tucker kick), 6:27. Raiders 21–19. **Drive: 1 play, 52 yards, 0:11.**
- BAL – Terrance West 3-yard run (Joe Flacco–Mike Wallace pass), 3:36. Ravens 27–21. **Drive: 4 plays, 17 yards, 1:59.**
- OAK – Michael Crabtree 23-yard pass from Derek Carr (Sebastian Janikowski kick), 2:12. Raiders 28–27. **Drive: 6 plays, 66 yards, 1:24.**

**Top passers**

- OAK – Derek Carr – 25/35, 199 yards, 4 TD
- BAL – Joe Flacco – 32/52, 298 yards, TD

**Top rushers**

- OAK – DeAndré Washington – 5 rushes, 30 yards
- BAL – Terrance West – 21 rushes, 113 yards, TD

**Top receivers**

- OAK – Michael Crabtree – 7 receptions, 88 yards, 3 TD
- BAL – Steve Smith Sr. – 8 receptions, 111 yards, TD

The Ravens stayed at home for a matchup against the Raiders who never won at Baltimore. Unfortunately the Ravens could not hold on to the lead after Derek Carr found Michael Crabtree in the end zone near the end of the game. Baltimore began driving down the field but the drive stalled allowing the Raiders to win at Baltimore for the first time in history dropping the Ravens 3–1. With the Steelers win, the Ravens dropped to second place in the AFC North

==== Week 5: Washington Redskins 16, Baltimore Ravens 10 ====
Week Five: Washington Redskins at Baltimore Ravens – Game summary

Quarter	1	2	3	4	Total
**Redskins**	6	0	10	0	**16**
Ravens	7	3	0	0	**10**

at M&T Bank Stadium, Baltimore, Maryland

- Date: October 9
- Game time: 1:00 pm. EDT
- Game weather: 65 °F (18 °C), sunny
- Game attendance: 71,318
- Referee: Ronald Torbert
- TV announcers (Fox): Sam Rosen, Daryl Johnston and Laura Okmin
- Recap, Gamebook

Game information

**First quarter**

- BAL – Crockett Gillmore 7-yard pass from Joe Flacco (Justin Tucker kick), 10:13. Ravens 7–0. **Drive: 9 plays, 75 yards, 4:47.**
- WAS – Jamison Crowder 85-yard punt return (kick failed, hit left upright), 4:52. Ravens 7–6.

**Second quarter**

- BAL – Justin Tucker 43-yard field goal, 14:56. Ravens 10–6. **Drive: 12 plays, 71 yards, 4:56.**

**Third quarter**

- WAS – Pierre Garçon 21-yard pass from Kirk Cousins (Dustin Hopkins kick), 8:28. Redskins 13–10. **Drive: 3 plays, 50 yards, 1:33.**
- WAS – Dustin Hopkins 37-yard field goal, 0:14. Redskins 16–10. **Drive: 11 plays, 72 yards, 5:55.**

**Fourth quarter**

- No scoring plays

**Top passers**

- WAS – Kirk Cousins – 29/41, 260 yards, TD, INT
- BAL – Joe Flacco – 30/46, 210 yards, TD

**Top rushers**

- WAS – Matt Jones – 14 rushes, 31 yards
- BAL – Terrance West – 11 rushes, 95 yards

**Top receivers**

- WAS – Pierre Garçon – 5 receptions, 56 yards, TD
- BAL – Mike Wallace – 7 receptions, 63 yards

After a dismal loss to the Redskins in which Joe Flacco and the offense were completely shut out in the second half, the Ravens Fired Offensive Coordinator Marc Trestman. It was their first home loss to an NFC East team since 1997, when the Arizona Cardinals won at Memorial Stadium five years before moving to the NFC West.

==== Week 6: New York Giants 27, Baltimore Ravens 23 ====
Week Six: Baltimore Ravens at New York Giants – Game summary

Quarter	1	2	3	4	Total
Ravens	10	0	3	10	**23**
**Giants**	0	7	10	10	**27**

at MetLife Stadium, East Rutherford, New Jersey

- Date: October 16
- Game time: 1:00 pm. EDT
- Game weather: 66 °F (19 °C), partly cloudy
- Game attendance: 78,487
- Referee: Jeff Triplette
- TV announcers (CBS): Greg Gumbel, Trent Green and Jamie Erdahl
- Recap, Gamebook

Game information

**First quarter**

- BAL – Justin Tucker 23-yard field goal, 10:10. Ravens 3–0. **Drive: 10 plays, 70 yards, 4:50.**
- BAL – Terrance West 1-yard run (Justin Tucker kick), 6:42. Ravens 10–0. **Drive: 6 plays, 30 yards, 3:21.**

**Second quarter**

- NYG – Roger Lewis 24-yard pass from Eli Manning (Josh Brown kick), 2:28. Ravens 10–7. **Drive: 13 plays, 80 yards, 4:40.**

**Third quarter**

- NYG – Josh Brown 21-yard field goal, 9:48. Tied 10–10. **Drive: 15 plays, 72 yards, 5:12.**
- BAL – Justin Tucker 39-yard field goal, 2:22. Ravens 13–10. **Drive: 4 plays, 6 yards, 2:14.**
- NYG – Odell Beckham Jr. 75-yard pass from Eli Manning (Josh Brown kick), 2:10. Giants 17–13. **Drive: 1 play, 75 yards, 0:12.**

**Fourth quarter**

- BAL – Justin Tucker 35-yard field goal, 9:14. Giants 17–16. **Drive: 7 plays, 56 yards, 2:28.**
- NYG – Josh Brown 31-yard field goal, 5:54. Giants 20–16. **Drive: 7 plays, 61 yards, 3:20.**
- BAL – Terrance West 2-yard run (Justin Tucker kick), 2:04. Ravens 23–20. **Drive: 9 plays, 75 yards, 3:50.**
- NYG – Odell Beckham Jr. 66-yard pass from Eli Manning (Josh Brown kick), 1:24. Giants 27–23. **Drive: 4 plays, 75 yards, 0:40.**

**Top passers**

- BAL – Joe Flacco – 26/48, 307 yards
- NYG – Eli Manning – 32/46, 403 yards, 3 TD, 2 INT

**Top rushers**

- BAL – Terrance West – 23 rushes, 87 yards, 2 TD
- NYG – Rashad Jennings – 9 rushes, 15 yards

**Top receivers**

- BAL – Mike Wallace – 4 receptions, 97 yards
- NYG – Odell Beckham Jr. – 8 receptions, 222 yards, 2 TD

Trying to halt a two-game losing streak, the Ravens traveled to MetLife for one of their two straight games there. The Ravens had a chance to win the game by driving down the field in the final seconds, but the Giants defense held the Ravens back as Flacco threw an incompletion on the final play, dropping the Ravens to 3–3 and their second three-game losing streak in a year. The Ravens defense allowed Beckham two 60+ yard touchdowns, helping the Giants win.

==== Week 7: New York Jets 24, Baltimore Ravens 16 ====
Week Seven: Baltimore Ravens at New York Jets – Game summary

Quarter	1	2	3	4	Total
Ravens	10	6	0	0	**16**
**Jets**	7	7	10	0	**24**

at MetLife Stadium, East Rutherford, New Jersey

- Date: October 23
- Game time: 1:00 pm. EDT
- Game weather: 58 °F (14 °C), clear
- Game attendance: 78,160
- Referee: Walt Anderson
- TV announcers (CBS): Ian Eagle, Rich Gannon and Evan Washburn
- Recap, Gamebook

Game information

**First quarter**

- BAL – Chris Moore fumble recovery in the end zone (Justin Tucker kick), 9:37. Ravens 7–0.
- BAL – Justin Tucker 50-yard field goal, 4:27. Ravens 10–0. **Drive: 5 plays, 59 yards, 2:03.**
- NYJ – Quincy Enunwa 69-yard pass from Geno Smith (Nick Folk kick), 1:12. Ravens 10–7. **Drive: 5 plays, 76 yards, 3:15.**

**Second quarter**

- BAL – Justin Tucker 49-yard field goal, 11:57. Ravens 13–7. **Drive: 11 plays, 44 yards, 4:15.**
- NYJ – Matt Forte 13-yard pass from Ryan Fitzpatrick (Nick Folk kick), 1:45. Jets 14–13. **Drive: 7 plays, 85 yards, 2:49.**
- BAL – Justin Tucker 44-yard field goal, 0:00. Ravens 16–14. **Drive: 8 plays, 50 yards, 1:45.**

**Third quarter**

- NYJ – Nick Folk 22-yard field goal, 5:00. Jets 17–16. **Drive: 4 plays, −1 yard, 2:03.**
- NYJ – Matt Forte 1-yard run (Nick Folk kick), 0:56. Jets 24–16. **Drive: 3 plays, 5 yards, 0:50.**

**Fourth quarter**

- No scoring plays

**Top passers**

- BAL – Joe Flacco – 25/44, 248 yards, 2 INT
- NYJ – Ryan Fitzpatrick – 9/14, 120 yards, TD

**Top rushers**

- BAL – Terrance West – 8 rushes, 10 yards
- NYJ – Matt Forte – 30 rushes, 100 yards, TD

**Top receivers**

- BAL – Mike Wallace – 10 receptions, 120 yards
- NYJ – Quincy Enunwa – 2 receptions, 73 yards, TD

Trying to not fall to a four-game losing streak, the Ravens visited the New York Jets, who were also struggling. The Ravens offense did not get any better only managed a franchise record of six yards rushing in the entire game. The ineffective running game coupled with poor play from quarterback Joe Flacco resulted in the team's fourth straight loss as the team entered their bye week at 3–4. The Ravens had a chance to tie the game but were stopped allowing the Jets to win.

==== Week 9: Baltimore Ravens 21, Pittsburgh Steelers 14 ====
Week Nine: Pittsburgh Steelers at Baltimore Ravens – Game summary

Quarter	1	2	3	4	Total
Steelers	0	0	0	14	**14**
**Ravens**	7	3	3	8	**21**

at M&T Bank Stadium, Baltimore, Maryland

- Date: November 6
- Game time: 1:00 pm. EST
- Game weather: 65 °F (18 °C), partly cloudy
- Game attendance: 71,286
- Referee: John Hussey
- TV announcers (CBS): Ian Eagle, Rich Gannon and Evan Washburn
- Recap, Gamebook

Game information

**First quarter**

- BAL – Mike Wallace 95-yard pass from Joe Flacco (Justin Tucker kick), 1:07. Ravens 7–0. **Drive: 2 plays, 96 yards, 0:43.**

**Second quarter**

- BAL – Justin Tucker 49-yard field goal, 0:03. Ravens 10–0. **Drive: 9 plays, 43 yards, 1:41.**

**Third quarter**

- BAL – Justin Tucker 42-yard field goal, 4:50. Ravens 13–0. **Drive: 4 plays, 8 yards, 1:30.**

**Fourth quarter**

- BAL – Chris Moore 14-yard return of blocked punt (Joe Flacco–Steve Smith Sr. pass), 13:36. Ravens 21–0.
- PIT – Antonio Brown 23-yard pass from Ben Roethlisberger (Chris Boswell kick), 8:38. Ravens 21–7. **Drive: 9 plays, 75 yards, 4:58.**
- PIT – Ben Roethlisberger 4-yard run (Chris Boswell kick), 0:48. Ravens 21–14. **Drive: 7 plays, 65 yards, 1:20.**

**Top passers**

- PIT – Ben Roethlisberger – 23/45, 264 yards, TD, INT
- BAL – Joe Flacco – 18/30, 241 yards, TD, INT

**Top rushers**

- PIT – Le'Veon Bell – 14 rushes, 32 yards
- BAL – Terrance West – 15 rushes, 21 yards

**Top receivers**

- PIT – Eli Rogers – 6 receptions, 103 yards
- BAL – Mike Wallace – 6 receptions, 124 yards, TD

With their 4th straight win over Pittsburgh the Ravens would ascend to 1st place in the AFC North.

==== Week 10: Baltimore Ravens 28, Cleveland Browns 7 ====
Week Ten: Cleveland Browns at Baltimore Ravens – Game summary

Quarter	1	2	3	4	Total
Browns	0	7	0	0	**7**
**Ravens**	0	6	15	7	**28**

at M&T Bank Stadium, Baltimore, Maryland

- Date: November 10
- Game time: 8:25 pm. EST
- Game weather: 54 °F (12 °C), clear
- Game attendance: 70,921
- Referee: Jerome Boger
- TV announcers (NFLN/WBAL-TV): Al Michaels, Cris Collinsworth and Heather Cox
- Recap, Gamebook

Game information

**First quarter**

- No scoring plays

**Second quarter**

- BAL – Justin Tucker 25-yard field goal, 10:29. Ravens 3–0. **Drive: 8 plays, 41 yards, 3:53.**
- CLE – Seth DeValve 25-yard pass from Cody Kessler (Cody Parkey kick), 6:30. Browns 7–3. **Drive: 7 plays, 75 yards, 3:59.**
- BAL – Justin Tucker 40-yard field goal, 0:00. Browns 7–6. **Drive: 12 plays, 57 yards, 1:39.**

**Third quarter**

- BAL – Darren Waller 4-yard pass from Joe Flacco (Justin Tucker kick), 9:36. Ravens 13–7. **Drive: 9 plays, 64 yards, 3:58.**
- BAL – Steve Smith Sr. 11-yard pass from Joe Flacco (Joe Flacco–Kyle Juszczyk pass), 2:05. Ravens 21–7. **Drive: 6 plays, 43 yards, 2:57.**

**Fourth quarter**

- BAL – Breshad Perriman 27-yard pass from Joe Flacco (Justin Tucker kick), 6:21. Ravens 28–7. **Drive: 12 plays, 90 yards, 7:27.**

**Top passers**

- CLE – Cody Kessler – 11/18, 91 yards, TD
- BAL – Joe Flacco – 30/41, 296 yards, 3 TD, 2 INT

**Top rushers**

- CLE – Isaiah Crowell – 9 rushes, 23 yards
- BAL – Terrance West – 21 rushes, 65 yards

**Top receivers**

- CLE – Terrelle Pryor – 5 receptions, 48 yards
- BAL – Breshad Perriman – 3 receptions, 64 yards, TD

After a Joe Flacco interception which led to the Browns 7–6 at halftime, the Ravens dominated the rest of the game scoring 22–0 the rest of the game and leaving the Ravens sole first place of the division.

==== Week 11: Dallas Cowboys 27, Baltimore Ravens 17 ====
Week Eleven: Baltimore Ravens at Dallas Cowboys – Game summary

Quarter	1	2	3	4	Total
Ravens	7	3	0	7	**17**
**Cowboys**	0	10	7	10	**27**

at AT&T Stadium, Arlington, Texas

- Date: November 20
- Game time: 1:00 pm. EST/12:00 p.m. CST
- Game weather: Played indoors (retractable roof closed)
- Game attendance: 93,056
- Referee: John Parry
- TV announcers (CBS): Ian Eagle, Dan Fouts and Evan Washburn
- Recap, Gamebook

Game information

**First quarter**

- BAL – Terrance West 18-yard run (Justin Tucker kick), 5:28. Ravens 7–0. **Drive: 6 plays, 90 yards, 3:09.**

**Second quarter**

- DAL – Cole Beasley 3-yard pass from Dak Prescott (Dan Bailey kick), 5:55. Tied 7–7. **Drive: 6 plays, 52 yards, 3:36.**
- BAL – Justin Tucker 46-yard field goal, 1:37. Ravens 10–7. **Drive: 9 plays, 47 yards, 4:18.**
- DAL – Dan Bailey 30-yard field goal, 0:04. Tied 10–10. **Drive: 8 plays, 63 yards, 1:33.**

**Third quarter**

- DAL – Dez Bryant 4-yard pass from Dak Prescott (Dan Bailey kick), 7:31. Cowboys 17–10. **Drive: 10 plays, 92 yards, 5:49.**

**Fourth quarter**

- DAL – Dez Bryant 13-yard pass from Dak Prescott (Dan Bailey kick), 11:30. Cowboys 24–10. **Drive: 13 plays, 88 yards, 7:54.**
- BAL – Steve Smith Sr. 5-yard pass from Joe Flacco (Justin Tucker kick), 8:16. Cowboys 24–17. **Drive: 8 plays, 75 yards, 3:14.**
- DAL – Dan Bailey 21-yard field goal, 1:50. Cowboys 27–17. **Drive: 13 plays, 72 yards, 6:26.**

**Top passers**

- BAL – Joe Flacco – 23/35, 269 yards, TD
- DAL – Dak Prescott – 27/36, 301 yards, 3 TD

**Top rushers**

- BAL – Terrance West – 8 rushes, 42 yards, TD
- DAL – Ezekiel Elliott – 25 rushes, 97 yards

**Top receivers**

- BAL – Steve Smith Sr. – 8 receptions, 99 yards, TD
- DAL – Dez Bryant – 6 receptions, 80 yards, 2 TD

==== Week 12: Baltimore Ravens 19, Cincinnati Bengals 14 ====
Week Twelve: Cincinnati Bengals at Baltimore Ravens – Game summary

Quarter	1	2	3	4	Total
Bengals	0	3	6	5	**14**
**Ravens**	10	6	0	3	**19**

at M&T Bank Stadium, Baltimore, Maryland

- Date: November 27
- Game time: 1:00 pm. EST
- Game weather: 50 °F (10 °C), sunny
- Game attendance: 70,903
- Referee: Clete Blakeman
- TV announcers (CBS): Ian Eagle, Dan Fouts and Evan Washburn
- Recap, Gamebook

Game information

**First quarter**

- BAL – Breshad Perriman 14-yard pass from Joe Flacco (Justin Tucker kick), 10:15. Ravens 7–0. **Drive: 11 plays, 75 yards, 4:45.**
- BAL – Justin Tucker 52-yard field goal, 5:39. Ravens 10–0. **Drive: 7 plays, 2 yards, 2:41.**

**Second quarter**

- CIN – Mike Nugent 23-yard field goal, 14:50. Ravens 10–3. **Drive: 14 plays, 69 yards, 5:49.**
- BAL – Justin Tucker 57-yard field goal, 1:40. Ravens 13–3. **Drive: 7 plays, 41 yards, 2:55.**
- BAL – Justin Tucker 54-yard field goal, 0:00. Ravens 16–3. **Drive: 7 plays, 37 yards, 1:01.**

**Third quarter**

- CIN – Tyler Eifert 3-yard pass from Andy Dalton (kick failed, wide right), 4:16. Ravens 16–9. **Drive: 11 plays, 86 yards, 4:58.**

**Fourth quarter**

- BAL – Justin Tucker 36-yard field goal, 12:16. Ravens 19–9. **Drive: 12 plays, 59 yards, 7:00.**
- CIN – Mike Nugent 36-yard field goal, 6:00. Ravens 19–12. **Drive: 9 plays, 35 yards, 2:50.**
- CIN – Sam Koch out of bounds in the end zone for a safety, 0:00. Ravens 19–14.

**Top passers**

- CIN – Andy Dalton – 26/48, 283 yards, TD
- BAL – Joe Flacco – 25/36, 234 yards, TD, INT

**Top rushers**

- CIN – Rex Burkhead – 5 rushes, 29 yards
- BAL – Kenneth Dixon – 13 rushes, 49 yards

**Top receivers**

- CIN – Tyler Eifert – 5 receptions, 68 yards, TD
- BAL – Mike Wallace – 3 receptions, 57 yards

==== Week 13: Baltimore Ravens 38, Miami Dolphins 6 ====
Week Thirteen: Miami Dolphins at Baltimore Ravens – Game summary

Quarter	1	2	3	4	Total
Dolphins	0	0	0	6	**6**
**Ravens**	14	10	0	14	**38**

at M&T Bank Stadium, Baltimore, Maryland

- Date: December 4
- Game time: 1:02 pm. EST
- Game weather: 47 °F (8 °C), partly cloudy
- Game attendance: 70,916
- Referee: Carl Cheffers
- TV announcers (CBS): Kevin Harlan, Rich Gannon and Chris Fischer
- Recap, Gamebook

Game information

**First quarter**

- BAL – Terrance West 3-yard pass from Joe Flacco (Justin Tucker kick), 10:57. Ravens 7–0. **Drive: 8 plays, 79 yards, 4:03.**
- BAL – Dennis Pitta 13-yard pass from Joe Flacco (Justin Tucker kick), 3:17. Ravens 14–0. **Drive: 8 plays, 63 yards, 3:37.**

**Second quarter**

- BAL – Dennis Pitta 9-yard pass from Joe Flacco (Justin Tucker kick), 2:10. Ravens 21–0. **Drive: 18 plays, 88 yards, 8:57.**
- BAL – Justin Tucker 55-yard field goal, 0:00. Ravens 24–0. **Drive: 7 plays, 48 yards, 0:59.**

**Third quarter**

- No scoring plays

**Fourth quarter**

- MIA – DeVante Parker 8-yard pass from Ryan Tannehill (pass failed), 14:42. Ravens 24–6. **Drive: 1 play, 8 yards, 0:05.**
- BAL – Breshad Perriman 53-yard pass from Joe Flacco (Justin Tucker kick), 12:49. Ravens 31–6. **Drive: 4 plays, 75 yards, 1:53.**
- BAL – Terrance West 9-yard run (Justin Tucker kick), 5:55. Ravens 38–6. **Drive: 4 plays, 41 yards, 1:26.**

**Top passers**

- MIA – Ryan Tannehill – 29/40, 229 yards, TD, 3 INT
- BAL – Joe Flacco – 36/47, 381 yards, 4 TD, INT

**Top rushers**

- MIA – Jay Ajayi – 12 rushes, 61 yards
- BAL – Kenneth Dixon – 6 rushes, 56 yards

**Top receivers**

- MIA – Jarvis Landry – 11 receptions, 87 yards
- BAL – Dennis Pitta – 9 receptions, 90 yards, 2 TD

With the commanding win, the Ravens improved to 7–5.

==== Week 14: New England Patriots 30, Baltimore Ravens 23 ====
Week Fourteen: Baltimore Ravens at New England Patriots – Game summary

Quarter	1	2	3	4	Total
Ravens	0	3	14	6	**23**
**Patriots**	9	7	7	7	**30**

at Gillette Stadium, Foxborough, Massachusetts

- Date: December 12
- Game time: 8:30 pm. EST
- Game weather: 31 °F (−1 °C), clear
- Game attendance: 66,829
- Referee: Ed Hochuli
- TV announcers (ESPN): Sean McDonough, Jon Gruden and Lisa Salters
- Recap, Gamebook

Game information

**First quarter**

- NE – Kenneth Dixon tackled in the end zone by Malcom Brown and Patrick Chung for a safety, 10:47. Patriots 2–0. **Drive: 1 play, −1 yards, 0:06.**
- NE – LeGarrette Blount 1-yard run (Stephen Gostkowski kick), 1:04. Patriots 9–0. **Drive: 10 plays, 74 yards, 4:47.**

**Second quarter**

- NE – Malcolm Mitchell 6-yard pass from Tom Brady (Stephen Gostkowski kick), 9:28. Patriots 16–0. **Drive: 8 plays, 89 yards, 3:27.**
- BAL – Justin Tucker 50-yard field goal, 0:11. Patriots 16–3. **Drive: 5 plays, 20 yards, 0:49.**

**Third quarter**

- NE – Martellus Bennett 19-yard pass from Tom Brady (Stephen Gostkowski kick), 8:45. Patriots 23–3. **Drive: 7 plays, 65 yards, 3:56.**
- BAL – Darren Waller 3-yard pass from Joe Flacco (Justin Tucker kick), 6:50. Patriots 23–10. **Drive: 2 plays, 3 yards, 0:07.**
- BAL – Kenneth Dixon 8-yard pass from Joe Flacco (Justin Tucker kick), 5:24. Patriots 23–17. **Drive: 4 plays, 22 yards, 1:19.**

**Fourth quarter**

- BAL – Justin Tucker 38-yard field goal, 6:35. Patriots 23–20. **Drive: 9 plays, 56 yards, 6:20.**
- NE – Chris Hogan 79-yard pass from Tom Brady (Stephen Gostkowski kick), 6:18. Patriots 30–20. **Drive: 1 play, 79 yards, 0:17.**
- BAL – Justin Tucker 37-yard field goal, 2:03. Patriots 30–23. **Drive: 10 plays, 61 yards, 4:15.**

**Top passers**

- BAL – Joe Flacco – 37/52, 324 yards, 2 TD, INT
- NE – Tom Brady – 25/38, 406 yards, 3 TD, INT

**Top rushers**

- BAL – Kenneth Dixon – 11 rushes, 39 yards,
- NE – LeGarrette Blount – 18 rushes, 72 yards, TD

**Top receivers**

- BAL – Steve Smith Sr. – 4 receptions, 57 yards
- NE – Chris Hogan – 5 receptions, 129 yards, TD

With the loss, the Ravens fell to 7–6 and 1–8 all time against the Patriots in the regular season.

==== Week 15: Baltimore Ravens 27, Philadelphia Eagles 26 ====
Week Fifteen: Philadelphia Eagles at Baltimore Ravens – Game summary

Quarter	1	2	3	4	Total
Eagles	3	11	0	12	**26**
**Ravens**	10	10	0	7	**27**

at M&T Bank Stadium, Baltimore, Maryland

- Date: December 18
- Game time: 1:03 pm. EST
- Game weather: 62 °F (17 °C), cloudy
- Game attendance: 71,223
- Referee: Craig Wrolstad
- TV announcers (Fox): Kenny Albert, Daryl Johnston and Laura Okmin
- Recap, Gamebook

Game information

**First quarter**

- BAL – Kamar Aiken 5-yard pass from Joe Flacco (Justin Tucker kick), 11:38. Ravens 7–0. **Drive: 5 plays, 36 yards, 1:54.**
- PHI – Caleb Sturgis 45-yard field goal, 4:42. Ravens 7–3. **Drive: 6 plays, 16 yards, 2:47.**
- BAL – Justin Tucker 53-yard field goal, 1:55. Ravens 10–3. **Drive: 7 plays, 53 yards, 2:47.**

**Second quarter**

- PHI – Ryan Mathews 4-yard run (Ryan Mathews run), 14:38. Eagles 11–10. **Drive: 1 play, 8 yards, 0:06.**
- BAL – Justin Tucker 47-yard field goal, 9:21. Ravens 13–11. **Drive: 10 plays, 47 yards, 5:17.**
- PHI – Caleb Sturgis 34-yard field goal, 1:39. Eagles 14–13. **Drive: 17 plays, 59 yards, 7:42.**
- BAL – Steve Smith Sr. 34-yard pass from Joe Flacco (Justin Tucker kick), 0:09. Ravens 20–14. **Drive: 8 plays, 65 yards, 1:30.**

**Third quarter**

- No scoring plays

**Fourth quarter**

- PHI – Caleb Sturgis 27-yard field goal, 14:48. Ravens 20–17. **Drive: 13 plays, 79 yards, 6:59.**
- BAL – Kenneth Dixon 16-yard run (Justin Tucker kick), 11:06. Ravens 27–17. **Drive: 8 plays, 69 yards, 3:42.**
- PHI – Caleb Sturgis 29-yard field goal, 2:22. Ravens 27–20. **Drive: 11 plays, 49 yards, 3:50.**
- PHI – Carson Wentz 4-yard run (pass failed), 0:04. Ravens 27–26. **Drive: 9 plays, 59 yards, 1:35.**

**Top passers**

- PHI – Carson Wentz – 22/42, 170 yards, INT
- BAL – Joe Flacco – 16/30, 206 yards, 2 TD, INT

**Top rushers**

- PHI – Ryan Mathews – 13 rushes, 77 yards
- BAL – Terrance West – 20 rushes, 128 yards, TD

**Top receivers**

- PHI – Zach Ertz – 6 receptions, 80 yards
- BAL – Mike Wallace – 2 receptions, 60 yards

John Harbaugh faced his previous team, the Philadelphia Eagles. He was their special teams coordinator from 1998 to 2006 and their defensive backs coach in 2007. With their playoff hopes on the line, the Ravens were dealt a heavy hand against a struggling Eagles team. After giving up two scoring drives in the final six minutes, the Ravens escaped defeat when the Eagles went for two for the win and failed.

==== Week 16: Pittsburgh Steelers 31, Baltimore Ravens 27 ====
NFL on Christmas Day

Week Sixteen: Baltimore Ravens at Pittsburgh Steelers – Game summary

Quarter	1	2	3	4	Total
Ravens	3	3	11	10	**27**
**Steelers**	7	0	3	21	**31**

at Heinz Field, Pittsburgh, Pennsylvania

- Date: December 25
- Game time: 4:30 pm. EST
- Game weather: 41 °F (5 °C), partly cloudy
- Game attendance: 66,276
- Referee: John Parry
- TV announcers (NFLN): Mike Tirico, Doug Flutie, Tony Dungy and Heather Cox
- Recap, Gamebook

Game information

**First quarter**

- PIT – Xavier Grimble 20-yard pass from Ben Roethlisberger (Chris Boswell kick), 7:12. Steelers 7–0. **Drive: 9 plays, 87 yards, 5:17.**
- BAL – Justin Tucker 41-yard field goal, 5:50. Steelers 7–3. **Drive: 5 plays, 58 yards, 1:22.**

**Second quarter**

- BAL – Justin Tucker 38-yard field goal, 0:18. Steelers 7–6. **Drive: 12 plays, 53 yards, 3:23.**

**Third quarter**

- BAL – Steve Smith Sr. 18-yard pass from Joe Flacco (Joe Flacco–Steve Smith Sr. pass), 13:26. Ravens 14–7. **Drive: 3 plays, 20 yards, 1:21.**
- PIT – Chris Boswell 36-yard field goal, 9:35. Ravens 14–10. **Drive: 8 plays, 65 yards, 3:51.**
- BAL – Justin Tucker 46-yard field goal, 1:28. Ravens 17–10. **Drive: 12 plays, 47 yards, 8:07.**

**Fourth quarter**

- BAL – Justin Tucker 23-yard field goal, 14:18. Ravens 20–10. **Drive: 4 plays, 7 yards, 1:19.**
- PIT – Le'Veon Bell 7-yard run (Chris Boswell kick), 11:41. Ravens 20–17. **Drive: 5 plays, 75 yards, 2:37.**
- PIT – Le'Veon Bell 7-yard pass from Ben Roethlisberger (Chris Boswell kick), 7:16. Steelers 24–20. **Drive: 6 plays, 90 yards, 2:49.**
- BAL – Kyle Juszczyk 10-yard run (Justin Tucker kick), 1:18. Ravens 27–24. **Drive: 14 plays, 75 yards, 5:58.**
- PIT – Antonio Brown 4-yard pass from Ben Roethlisberger (Chris Boswell kick), 0:09. Steelers 31–27. **Drive: 10 plays, 75 yards, 1:09.**

**Top passers**

- BAL – Joe Flacco – 30/44, 262 yards, TD, INT
- PIT – Ben Roethlisberger – 24/33, 279 yards, 3 TD, 2 INT

**Top rushers**

- BAL – Kenneth Dixon – 12 rushes, 57 yards
- PIT – Le'Veon Bell – 20 rushes, 122 yards, TD

**Top receivers**

- BAL – Steve Smith Sr. – 7 receptions, 79 yards, TD
- PIT – Antonio Brown – 10 receptions, 96 yards, TD

Not only did the Ravens drop to 8–7, but their four-game winning streak over the Steelers was snapped and they were eliminated from the playoff contention for the second consecutive year.

==== Week 17: Cincinnati Bengals 27, Baltimore Ravens 10 ====
Week Seventeen: Baltimore Ravens at Cincinnati Bengals – Game summary

Quarter	1	2	3	4	Total
Ravens	3	0	0	7	**10**
**Bengals**	14	6	0	7	**27**

at Paul Brown Stadium, Cincinnati, Ohio

- Date: January 1, 2017
- Game time: 1:00 pm. EST
- Game weather: 40 °F (4 °C), partly cloudy
- Game attendance: 54,944
- Referee: Pete Morelli
- TV announcers (CBS): Carter Blackburn and Chris Simms
- Recap, Gamebook

Game information

**First quarter**

- CIN – Rex Burkhead 5-yard run (Randy Bullock kick), 10:17. Bengals 7–0. **Drive: 8 plays, 59 yards, 3:49.**
- BAL – Justin Tucker 30-yard field goal, 3:12. Bengals 7–3. **Drive: 13 plays, 63 yards, 7:05.**
- CIN – C. J. Uzomah 1-yard pass from Andy Dalton (Randy Bullock kick), 0:00. Bengals 14–3. **Drive: 6 plays, 60 yards, 3:12.**

**Second quarter**

- CIN – Randy Bullock 23-yard field goal, 6:09. Bengals 17–3. **Drive: 12 plays, 77 yards, 4:57.**
- CIN – Randy Bullock 24-yard field goal, 0:03. Bengals 20–3. **Drive: 8 plays, 74 yards, 2:25.**

**Third quarter**

- No scoring plays

**Fourth quarter**

- BAL – Kenneth Dixon 1-yard run (Justin Tucker kick), 8:37. Bengals 20–10. **Drive: 8 plays, 70 yards, 3:12.**
- CIN – Rex Burkhead 5-yard run (Randy Bullock kick), 2:20. Bengals 27–10. **Drive: 6 plays, 25 yards, 2:24.**

**Top passers**

- BAL – Joe Flacco – 32/49, 267 yards, INT
- CIN – Andy Dalton – 18/28, 226 yards, TD

**Top rushers**

- BAL – Kenneth Dixon – 10 rushes, 44 yards, TD
- CIN – Rex Burkhead – 27 rushes, 119 yards, 2 TD

**Top receivers**

- BAL – Dennis Pitta – 11 receptions, 91 yards
- CIN – Cody Core – 4 receptions, 82 yards

This would be Steve Smith's Sr.'s final game in the NFL. He finished the game with three catches for 34 yards. After the game, he immediately retired, ending his 16-year career.

With the loss, the Ravens ended their season at 8–8.

=== Standings ===
==== Division ====
AFC North
	W	L	T	PCT	DIV	CONF	PF	PA	STK
^{(3)} Pittsburgh Steelers	11	5	0	.688	5–1	9–3	399	327	W7
Baltimore Ravens	8	8	0	.500	4–2	7–5	343	321	L2
Cincinnati Bengals	6	9	1	.406	3–3	5–7	325	315	W1
Cleveland Browns	1	15	0	.063	0–6	1–11	264	452	L1

==== Conference ====
AFC
#	Team	Division	W	L	T	PCT	DIV	CONF	SOS	SOV	STK
**Division leaders**
1	New England Patriots	East	14	2	0	.875	5–1	11–1	.439	.424	W7
2 (Note: Kansas City clinched the AFC West division over Oakland based on head-to-head sweep.)	Kansas City Chiefs	West	12	4	0	.750	6–0	9–3	.508	.479	W2
3	Pittsburgh Steelers	North	11	5	0	.688	5–1	9–3	.494	.423	W7
4 (Note: Houston clinched the AFC South division title over Tennessee based on record vs. division opponents.)	Houston Texans	South	9	7	0	.563	5–1	7–5	.502	.427	L1
**Wild Cards**
5	Oakland Raiders	West	12	4	0	.750	3–3	9–3	.504	.443	L1
6	Miami Dolphins	East	10	6	0	.625	4–2	7–5	.455	.341	L1
**Did not qualify for the postseason**
7 (Note: Tennessee finished ahead of Denver based on head-to-head victory.)	Tennessee Titans	South	9	7	0	.563	2–4	6–6	.465	.458	W1
8	Denver Broncos	West	9	7	0	.563	2–4	6–6	.549	.455	W1
9 (Note: Baltimore finished ahead of Indianapolis based on record vs. conference opponents.)	Baltimore Ravens	North	8	8	0	.500	4–2	7–5	.498	.363	L2
10	Indianapolis Colts	South	8	8	0	.500	3–3	5–7	.492	.406	W1
11	Buffalo Bills	East	7	9	0	.438	1–5	4–8	.482	.339	L2
12	Cincinnati Bengals	North	6	9	1	.406	3–3	5–7	.521	.333	W1
13 (Note: The New York Jets finished ahead of San Diego based record vs. common opponents — the Jets' cumulative record against Cleveland, Indianapolis, Kansas City and Miami was 1–4, while San Diego's cumulative record against the same four teams was 0–5.)	New York Jets	East	5	11	0	.313	2–4	4–8	.518	.313	W1
14	San Diego Chargers	West	5	11	0	.313	1–5	4–8	.543	.513	L5
15	Jacksonville Jaguars	South	3	13	0	.188	2–4	2–10	.527	.417	L1
16	Cleveland Browns	North	1	15	0	.063	0–6	1–11	.549	.313	L1
**Tiebreakers** (Note: When breaking ties for three or more teams under the NFL's rules, they are first broken within divisions, then comparing only the highest ranked remaining team from each division.)
