= Patrick Onwuasor =

American football player (born 1992)

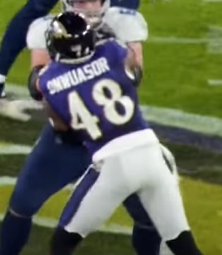
- Onwuasor with the Baltimore Ravens in 2020

No. 48, 51
- Position: Linebacker

Personal information
- Born: August 22, 1992 (age 34); Inglewood, California, U.S.
- Listed height: 6 ft 0 in (1.83 m)
- Listed weight: 227 lb (103 kg)

Career information
- High school: Inglewood
- College: Portland State; Arizona
- NFL draft: 2016: undrafted

Career history
- Baltimore Ravens (2016–2019); New York Jets (2020); Las Vegas Raiders (2021)

Career NFL statistics
- Total tackles: 234
- Sacks: 9.5
- Forced fumbles: 5
- Fumble recoveries: 1
- Interceptions: 1
- Stats at Pro Football Reference

Patrick Onwuasor (born August 22, 1992), nicknamed "Peanut", is an American former professional football player who was a linebacker in the National Football League (NFL). He played college football for the Portland State Vikings and signed with the Baltimore Ravens as an undrafted free agent in 2016.

== Professional career ==
Pre-draft measurables
Height	Weight	Arm length	Hand span	40-yard dash	10-yard split	20-yard split	20-yard shuttle	Three-cone drill	Vertical jump	Broad jump	Bench press
6 ft 0 in (1.83 m)	213 lb (97 kg)	32 3/8 in (0.82 m)	10 1/4 in (0.26 m)	4.62 s	1.69 s	2.63 s	4.60 s	7.51 s	36 1/2 in (0.93 m)	10 ft 3 in (3.12 m)	24 reps
All values from NFL Combine

=== Baltimore Ravens ===
==== 2016 ====
On May 6, 2016, the Baltimore Ravens signed Onwuasor to a three-year $1.62 million contract as an undrafted free agent. Onwuasor competed for a roster spot as a backup inside linebacker and special teams player against Zach Orr, Brennen Beyer, and Kavell Conner. He began to draw the ire of teammates for his aggressive play and was involved with multiple altercations during training camp. On September 3, the Ravens waived Onwuasor as part of their final roster cuts, but re-signed him to their practice squad the next day. On October 15, the Ravens promoted Onwuasor to their active roster after C.J. Mosley sustained a thigh injury. Upon being added to the active roster, head coach John Harbaugh named Onwuasor the fifth inside linebacker on the Ravens' depth chart. He was listed behind Mosley, Orr, Albert McClellan, and Kamalei Correa.

On October 16, Onwuasor made his professional regular season debut and recorded one solo tackle as the Ravens lost 27–23 at the New York Giants in Week 6. On January 1, 2017, Onwuasor earned his first career start after Orr was placed on injured reserve due to a neck injury he sustained the previous week. He finished the Ravens' 27–10 loss at the Cincinnati Bengals with a season-high seven combined tackles. Onwuasor completed his rookie season in 2016 with 21 combined tackles (nine solo) in 11 games and one start.

==== 2017 ====
Onwuasor entered training camp in 2017 as a backup linebacker. He began competing against Correa for a job as a starting inside linebacker after it was left vacant due to the sudden retirement of Orr. Onwuasor performed well throughout the preseason and solidified himself as a candidate to win the starting inside linebacker role. Head coach John Harbaugh named Onwuasor a backup inside linebacker, behind Mosley and Correa, to begin the regular season.

On September 17, 2017, Onwuasor recorded two combined tackles and made his first career sack as the Ravens defeated the Cleveland Browns 24–10 in Week 2. Onwuasor sacked Browns' quarterback DeShone Kizer for a one-yard loss in the third quarter. In Week 3, Onwuasor earned his first career start in place of Correa and recorded seven combined tackles as the Ravens lost 44–7 at the Jacksonville Jaguars. In Week 5, Onwuasor got the job as a starting inside linebacker after surpassing Correa on the depth chart and retained the role for the remainder of the season. On November 19, he collected a season-high ten combined tackles (eight solo) during a 23–0 win at the Green Bay Packers in Week 11. Onwuasor finished the 2017 NFL season with 90 combined tackles (67 solo), two pass deflections, and one sack in 16 games and 13 starts.

==== 2018 ====
On January 1, 2018, the Ravens announced the retirement of defensive coordinator Dean Pees. On January 9, the Ravens announced their decision to promote linebackers coach Don Martindale to defensive coordinator.

On March 14, 2018, the Ravens signed Onwuasor to a one-year, $630,000 contract. Onwuasor entered training camp slated as a starting inside linebacker, but received competition from Albert McClellan, Bam Bradley, and Correa. Head coach John Harbaugh named Onwuasor a starting inside linebacker to begin the regular season. He began the season alongside outside linebackers Terrell Suggs and Matthew Judon and inside linebacker Mosley.

On September 23, 2018, Onwuasor recorded three combined tackles, broke up a pass, and made his first career interception during a 27–14 win against the Denver Broncos in Week 3. Onwuasor intercepted a pass by Broncos' quarterback Case Keenum, that was originally intended for tight end Jeff Heuerman, and returned it for an 89-yard touchdown before it was called back for a penalty in the fourth quarter. The touchdown was called back due to an illegal block above the waist by Judon. In Week 16, Onwuasor recorded nine combined tackles, two sacks, and forced a fumble on tight end Antonio Gates that was recovered by Tavon Young and returned it for a touchdown in a 22–10 win over the Los Angeles Chargers, earning him American Football Conference (AFC) Defensive Player of the Week. He finished the season with 59 combined tackles, 5.5 sacks, two forced fumbles, three passes defensed, and an interception.

==== 2019 ====
On March 8, 2019, the Ravens placed a second-round restricted free agent tender on Onwuasor. In Week 9 against the New England Patriots, Onwuasor recorded a team high eight tackles, sacked Tom Brady once, and forced a fumble on wide receiver Julian Edelman that teammate Marlon Humphrey returned for a 70–yard touchdown in the 37–20 win.

=== New York Jets ===
On April 6, 2020, Onwuasor signed a one-year deal with the New York Jets. He was placed on injured reserve on September 7. Onwuasor was activated on November 18. He was placed back on injured reserve on November 28, after sustaining a hamstring injury in Week 11.

=== Las Vegas Raiders ===
On September 6, 2021, Onwuasor was signed to the Las Vegas Raiders' practice squad. On November 17, Onwuasor was promoted to the active roster.

== NFL career statistics ==
Year	Team	GP	Comb	Solo	Ast	Sack	FF	FR	Yds	Int	Yds	Avg	Lng	TD	PD	Stf	Yds	KB
2016	BAL	11	21	8	12	0.0	1	0	0	0	0	0	0	0	0	0	0	0
2017	BAL	16	90	63	23	1.0	1	0	0	0	0	0	0	0	2	0	0	0
2018	BAL	16	59	37	22	5.5	2	0	0	1	33	33	33	0	3	0	0	0
2019	BAL	14	64	42	16	3.0	1	0	0	0	0	0	0	0	0	0	0	0
2020	NYJ	1	0	0	0	0.0	0	0	0	0	0	0.0	0	0	0	0	0	0
2021	LV	4	0	0	0	0.0	0	0	0	0	0	0.0	0	0	0	0	0	0
Career		62	234	150	73	9.5	5	0	0	1	33	33	33	0	6	0	0	0
