= Terrance West =

American football player (born 1991)

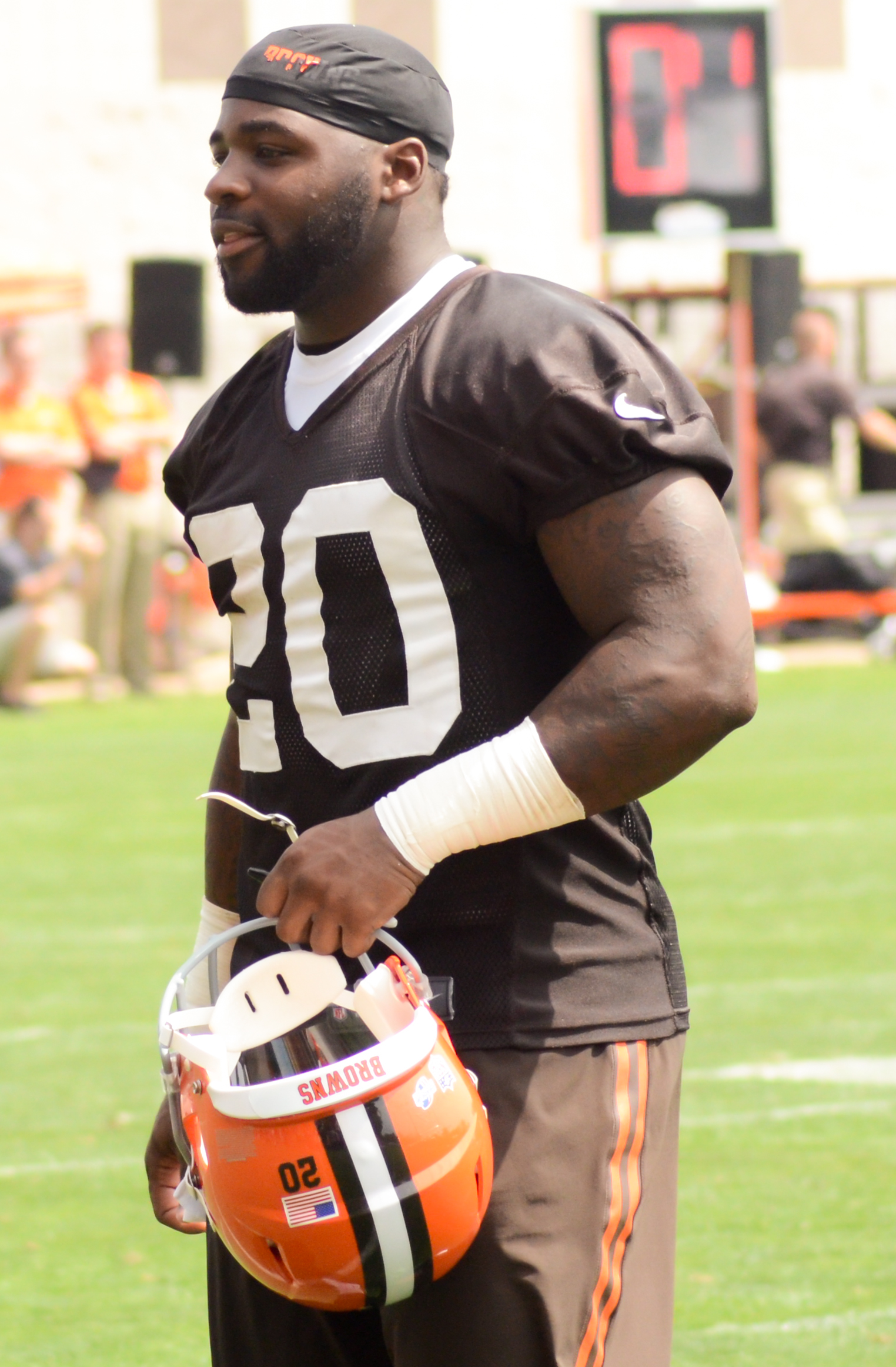
- West with the Cleveland Browns in 2014

No. 28, 35, 27
- Position: Running back

Personal information
- Born: January 28, 1991 (age 35); Baltimore, Maryland, U.S.
- Listed height: 5 ft 10 in (1.78 m)
- Listed weight: 225 lb (102 kg)

Career information
- High school: Northwestern (Baltimore)
- College: Towson (2011–2013)
- NFL draft: 2014: 3rd round, 94th overall pick

Career history
- Cleveland Browns (2014); Tennessee Titans (2015); Baltimore Ravens (2015–2017); New Orleans Saints (2018)*
- * Offseason or practice squad member only

Awards and highlights
- FCS Player of the Year (2013); CAA Offensive Player of the Year (2013); CAA Offensive Rookie of the Year (2011); Jerry Rice Award (2011); 3× First-team All-CAA (2011–2013)

Career NFL statistics
- Rushing yards: 1,816
- Rushing average: 3.9
- Rushing touchdowns: 11
- Receptions: 51
- Receiving yards: 344
- Receiving touchdowns: 2
- Stats at Pro Football Reference

Terrance West (born January 28, 1991) is an American former professional football player who was a running back in the National Football League (NFL). He played college football for the Towson Tigers and was selected by the Cleveland Browns in the third round of the 2014 NFL draft. West was also a member of the Tennessee Titans, Baltimore Ravens, and New Orleans Saints.

== Early life ==
West attended Northwestern High School in Baltimore, Maryland, where he had a stellar high school career; he was a two-time All-Baltimore City selection at running back, amassed 4,700 total yards over the course of his career and was an honorable mention All-Metro selection. He totaled over 2,000 all-purpose yards as a senior and 1,500 the previous year as a junior, helping lead his team to a 7–3 record as a junior and a 9–1 record during his senior season.

During his time at Northwestern, West was also a member of the basketball, baseball, and track & field teams. He was the leading scorer on his conference championship basketball team and a member of the top-ranked 4 × 100-meter relay team in the state. His personal bests: 11.2 seconds in the 100-meter dash, 22.4 seconds in the 200-meter dash and 6.95 meters (22'8") in the long jump.

=== Fork Union Military Academy ===
After high school, West looked to play college football, but his low academic qualifications and test scores limited his opportunities. In order to try and fulfill his dreams of playing college football, West chose to attend Fork Union Military Academy in Fork Union, Virginia. After playing for one year, he left because of the distance between him and his family. West's time at Fork Union Military Academy left him with no scholarship offers.

=== Hiatus ===
After prep school, West had to sit out a season due to NCAA rules and looked for a school that would accept him as a transfer student. During this time, he sold shoes at a Jimmy Jazz clothing store to support his young son.

West looked to play football at Clemson University, but he was not qualified due to low SAT scores. He was also recruited by University of Maryland, but the team's interest faded after the hiring of Randy Edsall. A paperwork error led to West missing yet another chance at playing college ball, this time for Morgan State University. After getting in contact with head coach Rob Ambrose and learning of the interest the team had in him, West eventually chose to attend Towson University.

== College career ==
At Towson, West had a record-breaking season in 2011 as a true freshman. The running back helped lead Towson to a 9–2 regular season, their first Coastal Athletic Association (CAA) Championship, and a playoff berth, all while rushing for a Towson freshman record 1,294 yards and 29 touchdowns. In the offseason, West would be selected as the first ever winner of the Jerry Rice Award as the top freshman in the Football Championship Subdivision (FCS).

West's sophomore season in 2012 saw a decline in personal statistics, coupled with a decline in wins for the team. He ran for 243 less yards and 15 fewer touchdowns than the season prior and the Tigers went 7–4, missing the playoffs. West had repeated behavioral issues during the season, most notably prior to the home game against eventual CAA Champion Old Dominion. West and Ambrose had a verbal altercation before the game which resulted in West not playing later that night. West walked off the sideline during the third quarter and threatened to quit the team via social media the next day, only to rejoin the team the next week.

In 2013, West had a resurgent junior season that would see more records fall. Through 16 games, he amassed 2,509 yards and 41 touchdowns (Towson University and NCAA Football Championship Subdivision (FCS) records) on 413 carries. His efforts helped lead the Tigers to a 10–2 record, including the programs first win over a Football Bowl Subdivision (FBS) opponent and the school's second ever FCS playoffs appearance. He was a finalist for the 2013 Walter Payton Award, finishing 3rd in the voting. West also played a major role in the Tigers' playoff wins at Eastern Illinois University and Eastern Washington University. These wins earned the Tigers a spot in the 2013 FCS National Championship game in Frisco, Texas, against the North Dakota State University Bison, a game that they would lose to the defending champions by a score of 35–7.

On January 6, West officially declared himself eligible for the 2014 NFL draft.

=== College career ===
| Year | Team | Rushing | | | | |
| Year | Team | GP | Att | Yds | Avg | TD |
|---|---|---|---|---|---|---|
| 2011 | Towson | 11 | 194 | 1,294 | 6.7 | 29 |
| 2012 | Towson | 10 | 195 | 1,046 | 5.4 | 14 |
| 2013 | Towson | 16 | 413 | 2,509 | 6.1 | 41 |
| Totals | | 37 | 802 | 4,849 | 6.1 | 84 |

=== Records ===
NCAA records

- NCAA FCS single season freshman touchdown record [29] (2011)
- NCAA FCS single season rushing yards record [2,509] (2013)
- NCAA FCS single season rushing touchdown record [41] (2013)

Towson records

- All-time leading rusher [4,854 yards, 84 touchdowns] (2011–2013)

== Professional career ==
Pre-draft measurables
| Height | Weight | Arm length | Hand span | 40-yard dash | Vertical jump | Broad jump | Bench press |
|---|---|---|---|---|---|---|---|
| 5 ft 9 1/4 in (1.76 m) | 225 lb (102 kg) | 31 in (0.79 m) | 9 1/8 in (0.23 m) | 4.54 s | 33.5 in (0.85 m) | 10 ft 0 in (3.05 m) | 16 reps |
All values from NFL Combine

=== Cleveland Browns ===
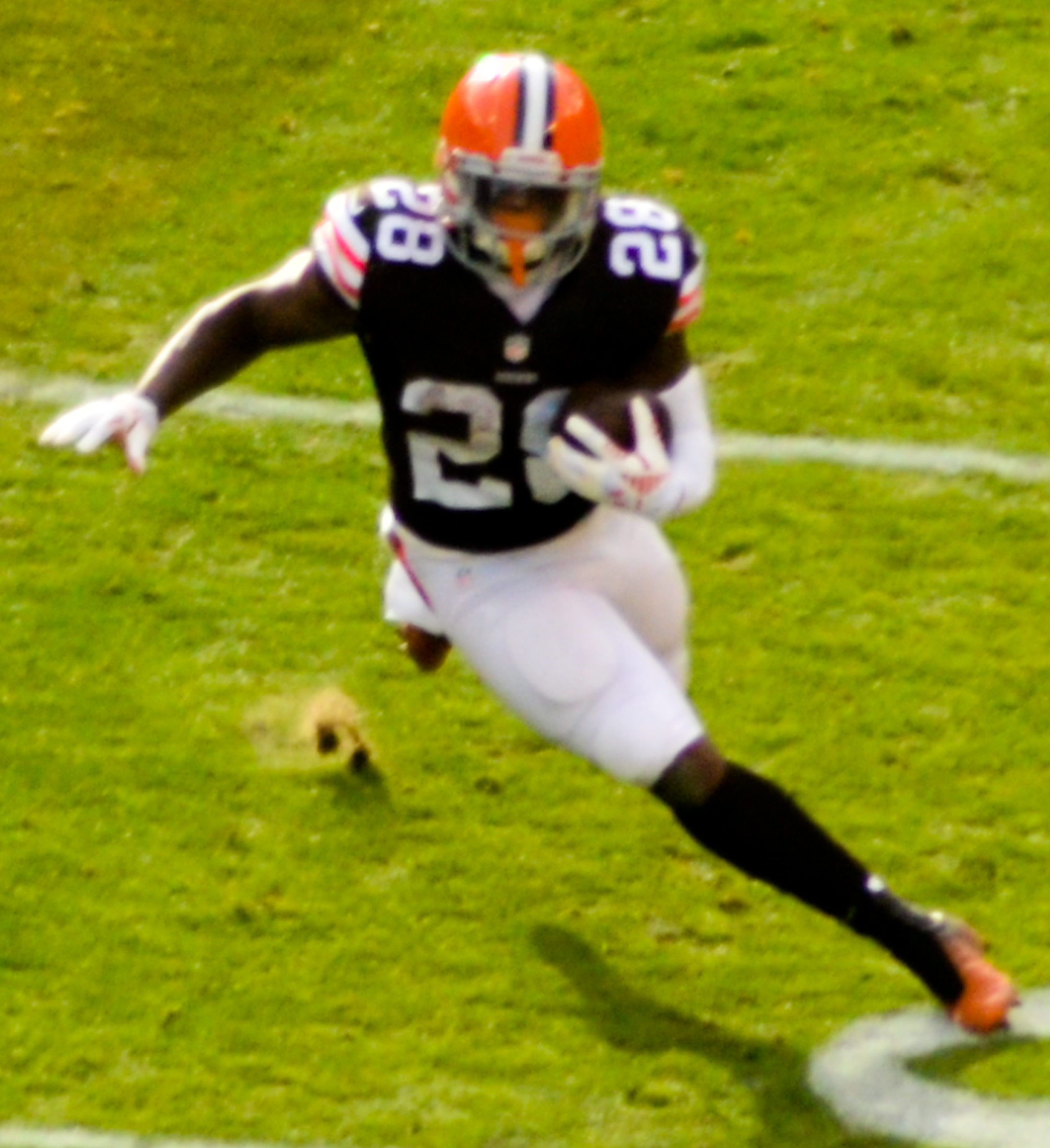
West with the Browns in 2014

The Cleveland Browns selected West in the third round (94th overall) of the 2014 NFL draft. In his first career NFL game against the Pittsburgh Steelers, West had his first 100-yard game with 100 yards on 16 carries, a 6.3-yard average. West finished the 2014 season as the Browns' leading rusher with 673 yards rushing on 171 carries with four touchdowns.

=== Tennessee Titans ===
West reported to Cleveland's 2015 preseason camp overweight and immediately reclaimed his position in the coaching staff's doghouse throughout the preseason. After the final preseason game in Chicago, the Browns decided to move on without West and on September 6, 2015, the Browns traded West to the Tennessee Titans for a conditional pick in the 2016 NFL draft. He was waived on November 7. During his tenure with the Titans, he was active in 2 games and inactive for two. He had 16 carries for 51 yards and 2 fumbles, which is double the number of fumbles he had during his rookie season with the Browns.

=== Baltimore Ravens ===
On November 10, 2015, West was signed to the practice squad of his hometown team, the Baltimore Ravens, after they lost starting running back Justin Forsett and back-up Lorenzo Taliaferro for the rest of the season. On November 18, he was promoted to the active roster. On November 30, West played in his first game with the Ravens, against his former team, the Browns.

In 2016, West appeared in all 16 games in the regular season and started 13 of them. He had a breakout performance in Week 4 against the Oakland Raiders, when he carried the ball 21 times for 113 yards and scored his first rushing touchdown as a Raven. However, the Ravens would ultimately lose 28–27. Two weeks later, in a shootout against the New York Giants, he ran the ball 23 times for 87 yards and two touchdowns, while also catching four passes for 36 yards, but the Ravens would lose 27–23. In week 13 against the Miami Dolphins, West had ten carries for 50 yards and a touchdown, while also catching three passes for 18 yards and a receiving touchdown, in a 38–6 blowout win. He finished the year with 193 carries, 774 rushing yards and five rushing touchdowns.

On May 8, 2017, West signed his original round tender to keep him under contract for the 2017 season.

In the 2017 season opener at the Cincinnati Bengals, West ran the ball 19 times for 80 yards and scored one of the game's two touchdowns, as the Ravens won 20–0. The following week, against his former team the Browns, West ran eight times for 22 yards and a touchdown, while also catching two passes for 23 yards in the 24–10 win. Due to a calf injury, he appeared in only five games that year and finished with 39 carries for 138 rushing yards and two rushing touchdowns.

=== New Orleans Saints ===
On June 14, 2018, West signed with the New Orleans Saints. He was released on August 21, 2018.

=== NFL career statistics ===
| Season | | Games | | Rushing | | | | | Receiving | | | | |
| Year | Team | GP | GS | Att | Yds | Avg | Lng | TD | Rec | Yards | Avg | Lng | TD |
|---|---|---|---|---|---|---|---|---|---|---|---|---|---|
| 2014 | CLE | 14 | 6 | 171 | 673 | 3.9 | 36 | 4 | 11 | 64 | 5.8 | 11 | 1 |
| 2015 | TEN | 2 | 0 | 16 | 51 | 3.2 | 12 | 0 | 0 | 0 | 0 | 0 | 0 |
| 2015 | BAL | 6 | 0 | 46 | 180 | 3.9 | 17 | 0 | 4 | 21 | 5.3 | 8 | 0 |
| 2016 | BAL | 16 | 13 | 193 | 774 | 4.0 | 41 | 5 | 34 | 236 | 6.9 | 17 | 1 |
| 2017 | BAL | 5 | 4 | 39 | 138 | 3.5 | 13 | 2 | 2 | 23 | 11.5 | 15 | 0 |
| Career | | 43 | 23 | 465 | 1,816 | 3.9 | 41 | 11 | 51 | 333 | 6.7 | 17 | 2 |
