= Brennen Beyer =

American football player (born 1992)

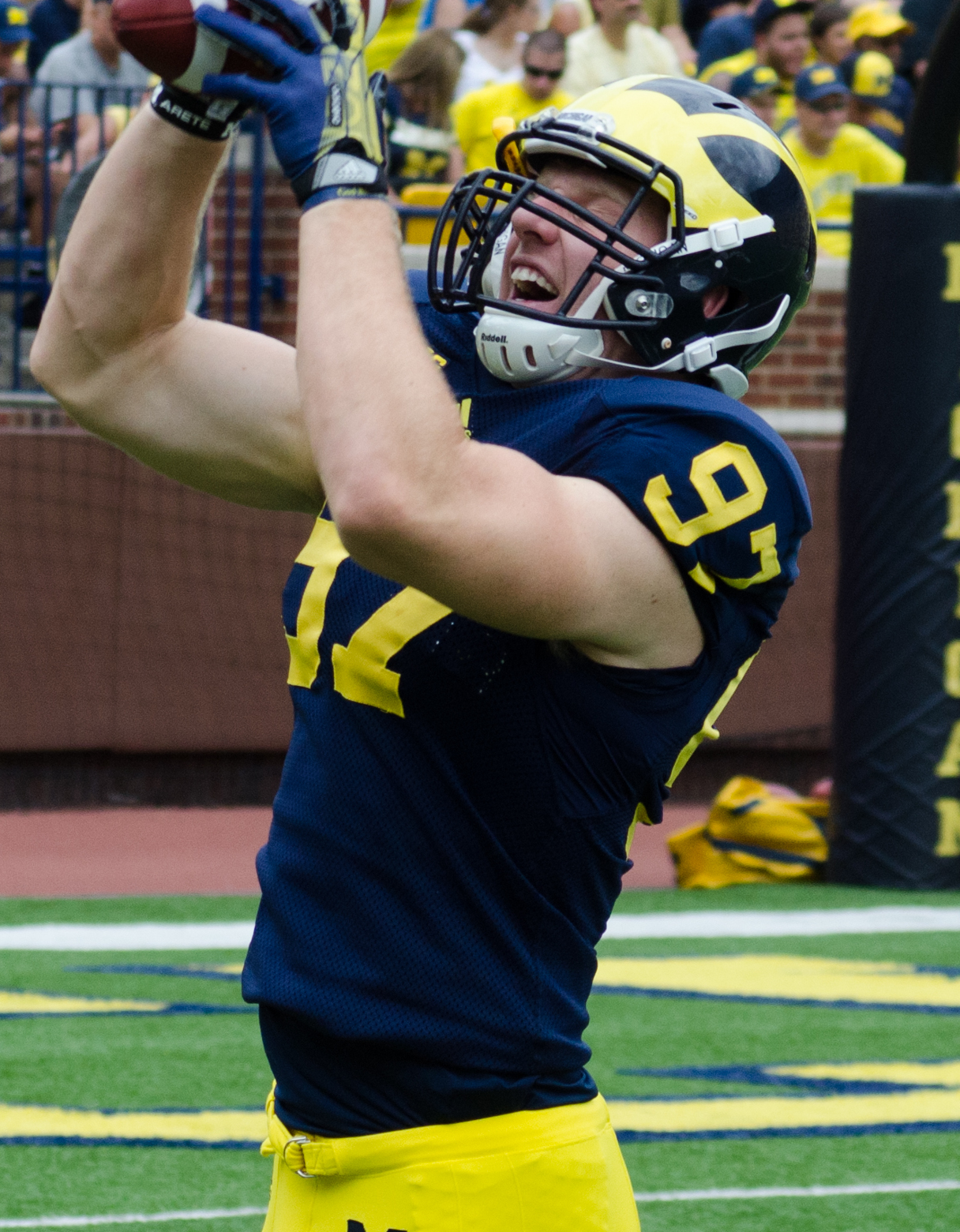
- Beyer in 2013

No. 45
- Positions: Defensive end, linebacker

Personal information
- Born: November 25, 1992 (age 33); Sayville, New York, U.S.
- Listed height: 6 ft 4 in (1.93 m)
- Listed weight: 256 lb (116 kg)

Career information
- High school: Plymouth (Canton Township, Michigan)
- College: Michigan
- NFL draft: 2015: undrafted

Career history
- Baltimore Ravens (2015–2016)

Awards and highlights
- Sugar Bowl champion (2012)

Career NFL statistics
- Total tackles: 3
- Stats at Pro Football Reference

Brennen Beyer (born November 25, 1992) is an American former professional football player who was a linebacker in the National Football League (NFL). He played college football for the Michigan Wolverines.

== High school ==
Beyer attended Plymouth High School, where he played football and was a first-team All-conference, All-league, All-Detroit West, and All-Metro Detroit selection as a junior and senior. He also was an Associated Press (AP) All-State honorable mention. As a senior, he recorded 65 tackles and 12 sacks.

== College career ==
After graduating from high school, Beyer enrolled at the University of Michigan College of Literature, Science and the Arts to major in psychology.

As a freshman in 2011, Beyer appeared in 11 games. He recorded 11 tackles (five solo.). In 2012 as a sophomore, he appeared in 11 games (nine starts). He recorded 19 tackles (nine solo.), 0.5 sacks, and once forced fumble. He was named to the academic All-Big Ten for the season. As a junior in 2013, he appeared in 13 games (five starts at linebacker, seven at defensive end). He recorded 27 tackles, four tackles-for-loss, two sacks, one forced fumble, and an interception returned for a touchdown. For the season, he was named to the academic All-Big Ten team. He also received the schools Athletic Academic Achievement award. In 2014 as a senior, he appeared in 12 games (11 starts). He recorded 35 tackles, 7.5 tackles-for-loss and 5.5 sacks. He was again named to the Academic All-Big Ten team.

=== Career statistics ===
Season				Defense					Fumbles	
Year	Team	GP	GS	Tack.	Solo.	Ass.	Sacks	TFL	FF	FR
2011	MICH	11	0	11	5	6	0	0	0	0
2012	MICH	11	9	19	9	10	0	0.5	1	0
2013	MICH	13	13	27	16	11	2	4	1	0
2014	MICH	12	11	35	16	19	6.5	8	0	0
Career		47	33	92	46	46	8.5	12.5	2	0

== Professional career ==
Pre-draft measurables
Height	Weight	40-yard dash	10-yard split	20-yard split	20-yard shuttle	Three-cone drill	Vertical jump	Broad jump	Bench press
6 ft 4 in (1.93 m)	256 lb (116 kg)	4.87 s	1.69 s	2.81 s	4.22 s	7.09 s	33 1/2 in (0.85 m)	9 ft 2 in (2.79 m)	20 reps
All values from Michigan pro day.

After going undrafted in the 2015 NFL draft, Beyer signed with the Baltimore Ravens on May 7, 2015. He was released during final cuts on September 5, 2015 and was signed to the practice squad the next day. On January 4, 2016, he signed a reserve/future contract the Ravens.

On September 3, 2016, Beyer was released by the Ravens and was signed to the practice squad the next day. On December 24, 2016, he was promoted to the Ravens' active roster. He made his professional debut during Week 17 against the Cincinnati Bengals, recording three tackles (two solo).

On September 2, 2017, Beyer was waived/injured by the Ravens and placed on injured reserve. He was released on September 6, 2017.

=== Career statistics ===
Season				Defense					Fumbles	
Year	Team	GP	GS	Tack.	Solo.	Ass.	Sacks	TFL	FF	FR
2016	BAL	1	0	3	2	1	0	0	0	0
Career		1	0	3	2	1	0	0	0	0
