= Tavon Young =

American football player (born 1994)

No. 36, 25
- Position: Cornerback

Personal information
- Born: March 14, 1994 (age 32); Oxon Hill, Maryland, U.S.
- Listed height: 5 ft 9 in (1.75 m)
- Listed weight: 185 lb (84 kg)

Career information
- High school: Potomac (Oxon Hill)
- College: Temple
- NFL draft: 2016: 4th round, 104th overall pick

Career history
- Baltimore Ravens (2016–2021); Chicago Bears (2022)

Career NFL statistics
- Total tackles: 127
- Sacks: 4
- Fumble recoveries: 3
- Interceptions: 4
- Defensive touchdowns: 2
- Stats at Pro Football Reference

Tavon Antonio Young (born March 14, 1994) is an American former professional football player who was a cornerback in the National Football League (NFL). He played college football for the Temple Owls. He was selected by the Baltimore Ravens in the fourth round of the 2016 NFL draft.

== Early life ==
Young attended Frederick Douglass High School from 2008 to 2011 and Potomac High School from 2011 to 2012 in Oxon Hill, Maryland, where he was teammates with cornerback Ronald Darby.

== Professional career ==
=== Pre-draft ===
On November 17, 2015, it was announced that Young accepted his invitation to play in the 2016 Senior Bowl.

External videos
- Tavon Young's NFL Combine Workout
- Tavon Young's 40-yard dash

Pre-draft measurables
Height	Weight	Arm length	Hand span	40-yard dash	10-yard split	20-yard split	20-yard shuttle	Three-cone drill	Vertical jump	Broad jump	Bench press
5 ft 9 1/8 in (1.76 m)	183 lb (83 kg)	30 5/8 in (0.78 m)	9 1/8 in (0.23 m)	4.46 s	1.54 s	2.60 s	3.93 s	6.80 s	34.5 in (0.88 m)	9 ft 10 in (3.00 m)	9 reps
All values are from NFL Combine

External videos
- Ravens draft Tavon Young 104th overall
- NFL Draft Profile: CB Tavon Young (Temple)

=== Baltimore Ravens ===
==== 2016 season ====
His home state Baltimore Ravens selected Young in the fourth round (104th overall) of the 2016 NFL draft. Young was the 16th cornerback drafted in 2016.

On May 9, 2016, the Ravens signed Young to a four-year, $2.94 million contract that includes a signing bonus of $605,130.

Young recorded his first career interception in Week 3 of the 2016 season in a 19–17 win vs. the Jacksonville Jaguars. He made his first NFL start in Week 6 against the New York Giants, recording three tackles and snagging his second interception of the season, picking off Eli Manning. He became the Ravens' No. 2 cornerback behind Jimmy Smith, playing in 16 games with 11 starts recording 53 tackles, eight passes defensed and two interceptions.

==== 2017 season ====
On June 1, 2017, Young suffered a torn ACL during organized team activities, and missed the entire 2017 season. He was placed on injured reserve on September 1, 2017.

==== 2018 season ====
Young entered the 2018 season as the Ravens No. 3 cornerback behind Brandon Carr and Marlon Humphrey. Young recorded his first two sacks of his career in the season opener against the Buffalo Bills, becoming the first Ravens defensive back to do so since Bennie Thompson in 1996. He recorded his third-career interception in Week 5 against the Cleveland Browns. In Week 13, Young recovered a fumble forced by Patrick Onwuasor and returned it 12 yards for the touchdown in a 26–16 win over the Atlanta Falcons. In Week 16, Young recovered another fumble forced by Onwuasor and returned it 62 yards for the touchdown in a 22–10 win over the Los Angeles Chargers. He played in 15 games with six starts, recording 37 combined tackles, five pass deflections, an interception, three fumble recoveries and two defensive touchdowns.

==== 2019 season ====
On February 21, 2019, Young signed a three-year, $25.8 million contract extension with the Ravens, making him the highest-paid nickel cornerback in the NFL. On August 15, 2019, head coach John Harbaugh announced that Young was expected to miss the entire 2019 NFL season due to a neck injury he suffered in practice. He was placed on season-ending injured reserve on August 31, 2019.

==== 2020 season ====
Young appeared in the Ravens' season opener against the Cleveland Browns, recording two solo tackles. During the first quarter of the Ravens' Week 2 matchup on September 20, 2020, against the Houston Texans, Young forced an incomplete pass, but suffered a torn ACL on the play and the team placed him on injured reserve following the game on September 28. He was placed on the reserve/COVID-19 list by the Ravens on November 28, 2020, and moved back to injured reserve three days later.

==== 2021 season ====
Young would see slightly more playing time in 2021 due in part to a season-ending ACL injury to fellow corner Marcus Peters. In Week 2 against the Kansas City Chiefs, he had a crucial interception off Patrick Mahomes in the 3rd quarter to help spark a rally as the Ravens won 36–35. He also broke up a pass during the game.

Young was released on March 9, 2022, after six seasons.

=== Chicago Bears ===
On April 11, 2022, the Chicago Bears signed Young to a one-year contract. He was placed on injured reserve on August 30, 2022. He was released on September 17.
