= 2022 Cincinnati Bengals season =

55th season in franchise history

- Owner: Mike Brown
- Head coach: Zac Taylor
- Offensive coordinator: Brian Callahan
- Defensive coordinator: Lou Anarumo
- Home stadium: Paycor Stadium

Results
- Record: 12–4
- Division place: 1st AFC North
- Playoffs: Won Wild Card Playoffs (vs. Ravens) 24–17; Won Divisional Playoffs (at Bills) 27–10; Lost AFC Championship (at Chiefs) 20–23
- Pro Bowlers: QB Joe Burrow; WR Ja'Marr Chase; DE Trey Hendrickson

Uniform
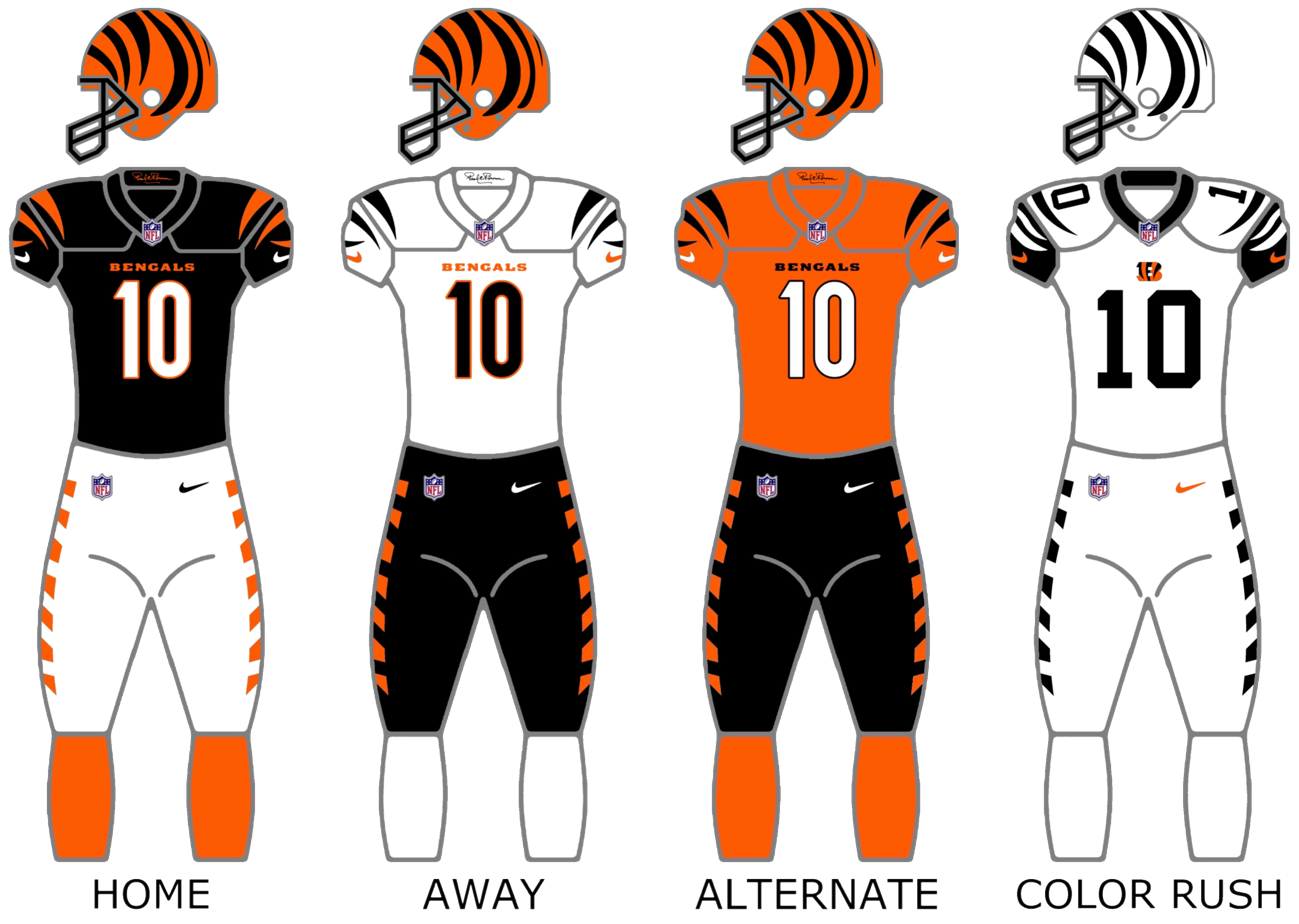

The 2022 season was the Cincinnati Bengals' 53rd in the National Football League (NFL), their 55th overall, and their fourth under head coach Zac Taylor. After an 0–2 start, the Bengals quickly turned around, winning 12 out of their last 14 games to match their franchise best record of 12–4. The Bengals improved upon their 10–7 record from the previous season and clinched the AFC North title for the second straight year. Cincinnati's Week 17 game against Buffalo was declared a no-contest (Note: Game started on January 2. Due to an injury involving Buffalo safety Damar Hamlin, the game was postponed part way through the first quarter. On January 5, the game was cancelled.) after Buffalo safety Damar Hamlin suffered cardiac arrest, resulting in only 16 games played. Despite the incident, they won the AFC North and won their last game to finish 12–4, tied for the best record in the history of the franchise. However, as a result of the cancellation they were deprived of the chance to get the two seed and risked losing home advantage if they lost their last game and coin toss to the Baltimore Ravens and the Los Angeles Chargers beat the Denver Broncos. Instead, they defeated Baltimore 27–16 to avoid that situation.

The Bengals defeated Baltimore 24–17 in the Wild Card round. The most notable play was a fumble recovery and 98-yard touchdown return by defensive end Sam Hubbard after linebacker Logan Wilson stripped the ball from Ravens quarterback Tyler Huntley on a quarterback sneak. The following week, the Bengals traveled to face Buffalo. Despite Buffalo's home-field advantage and snowy conditions, the Bengals prevailed 27–10. With the win, they advanced to the AFC Championship Game for the second consecutive year, a first in franchise history. The Bengals faced Kansas City in Arrowhead Stadium for a rematch of the previous year's contest and found themselves tied 20–20 late into the fourth quarter. However, a personal foul penalty by defensive end Joseph Ossai on Chiefs quarterback Patrick Mahomes would aid a late Kansas City field goal attempt and the Bengals ultimately lost 23–20 to the eventual Super Bowl LVII champions.

Shortly before the beginning of the preseason, the Bengals renamed their stadium Paycor Stadium. The stadium had been named after the team's founder and first head coach, Paul Brown, since it opened in 2000.

== Offseason ==
=== Free agents ===
As of March 29, 2022

==== Unrestricted ====
Position	Player	2022 Team	Date signed	Contract
QB	Brandon Allen	Cincinnati Bengals	March 17	1 year, $1.5 million
S	Ricardo Allen	Retired		
CB	Eli Apple	Cincinnati Bengals	March 17	1 year, $4 million
S	Jessie Bates III	Cincinnati Bengals	August 23	Franchise tagged
CB	Jalen Davis	Cincinnati Bengals	March 3	1 year, $1.035 million
LB	Jordan Evans	Seattle Sea Dragons (XFL)	November 18	
CB	Tre Flowers	Cincinnati Bengals	April 7	1 year, $1.85 million
CB	Vernon Hargreaves III			
LS	Clark Harris	Cincinnati Bengals	March 16	1 year, $1.272 million
DT	B.J. Hill	Cincinnati Bengals	March 14	3 years, $30 million
P	Kevin Huber	Cincinnati Bengals	May 2	1 year, $1.85 million
DT	Larry Ogunjobi	Pittsburgh Steelers	June 21	1 year, $8 million
CB	Darius Phillips	Las Vegas Raiders	March 15	1 year, $1.5 million
OT	Riley Reiff	Chicago Bears	July 26	1 year, $3 million
G	Quinton Spain			
WR	Auden Tate	Atlanta Falcons	March 28	1 year, $1.120 million
S	Michael Thomas	Cincinnati Bengals	March 16	1 year, $1.135 million
WR	Mike Thomas	Cincinnati Bengals	March 17	1 year, $1.120 million
DT	Josh Tupou	Cincinnati Bengals	March 17	2 years, $3 million
TE	C. J. Uzomah	New York Jets	March 14	3 years, $24 million

==== Restricted ====
Position	Player	2022 Team	Date signed	Contract
WR	Stanley Morgan Jr.	Cincinnati Bengals	March 21	2 years, $2.295 million

==== Exclusive rights ====
Position	Player	2022 Team	Date signed	Contract
WR	Trenton Irwin	Cincinnati Bengals	March 21	1 year, $825k
LB	Clay Johnston	Cincinnati Bengals	April 7	1 year, $825k
DE	Wyatt Ray	Jacksonville Jaguars	June 15	1 year, $895k
TE	Mitchell Wilcox	Cincinnati Bengals	April 8	1 year, $825k

=== Signings ===
Position	Player	2021 Team	Date signed	Contract
G	Alex Cappa	Tampa Bay Buccaneers	March 14	4 years, $35 million
C	Ted Karras	New England Patriots	March 14	3 years, $18 million
TE	Hayden Hurst	Atlanta Falcons	March 17	1 year, $3.5 million
OT	La'el Collins	Dallas Cowboys	March 20	3 years, $21 million
TE	Nick Eubanks	Detroit Lions	April 5	1 year, $705k
CB	Abu Daramy-Swaray	Potsdam Royals (GFL)	May 13	1 year, $705k

=== Releases ===
Position	Player	Date released	2022 Team	Contract
C	Trey Hopkins	March 18		
CB	Trae Waynes	March 21		
G	Fred Johnson	March 22	Tampa Bay Buccaneers	1 year, $1.525 million

=== Draft ===
2022 Cincinnati Bengals Draft
Round	Selection	Player	Position	College	Notes
1	31	Daxton Hill	S	Michigan	
2	60	Cam Taylor-Britt	CB	Nebraska	from Tampa Bay via Buffalo (Note: The Bengals traded second- and sixth-round selections (63rd and 209th overall) to the Buffalo Bills in exchange for a second-round selection (60th overall).)
2	63	Traded to Buffalo			
3	95	Zachary Carter	DT	Florida	
4	136	Cordell Volson	OT	North Dakota State	
5	166	Tycen Anderson	S	Toledo	from Arizona via Philadelphia, Houston and Chicago (Note: The Bengals traded fifth- and seventh-round selections (174th and 226th overall) to the Chicago Bears in exchange for a fifth-round selection (166th overall).)
5	174	Traded to Chicago			
6	209	Traded to Buffalo			
7	226	Traded to Chicago			from NY Giants (Note: The Bengals traded C Billy Price to the New York Giants in exchange for DL B. J. Hill and a conditional seventh-round selection.)
7	252	Jeffrey Gunter	DE	Coastal Carolina	

Draft trades

2022 Cincinnati Bengals undrafted free agents
Name	Position	College	Ref.
Cal Adomitis	LS	Pittsburgh	
Ben Brown	G, C	Ole Miss	
Devin Cochran	OT	Georgia Tech	
Allan George	CB	Vanderbilt	
Jaivon Heiligh	WR	Coastal Carolina	
Clarence Hicks	LB	UTSA	
Delonte Hood	CB	Peru State	
Shermari Jones	RB	Coastal Carolina	
Kwamie Lassiter II	WR	Kansas	
Desmond Noel	G	Florida Atlantic	
Kendric Pryor	WR	Wisconsin	
Bookie Radley-Hiles	S, CB	Washington	
Justin Rigg	TE	Kentucky	
Jack Sorenson	WR	Miami (OH)	
Tariqious Tisdale	DT, DE	Ole Miss	
Carson Wells	LB	Colorado	
Drew Plitt	QB	Ball State	

== Staff ==
2022 Cincinnati Bengals staff
Front office: Owner/president – Mike Brown; Executive vice president – Katie Blackburn; Vice president – Troy Blackburn; Vice president of player personnel – Paul H. Brown; Director of player personnel – Duke Tobin; Senior personnel executive – Trey Brown; College scouting director – Mike Potts; Pro scouting director – Steven Radicivec; Head coaches: Head coach – Zac Taylor; Assistant head coach/special teams coordinator – Darrin Simmons; Offensive coaches: Offensive coordinator – Brian Callahan; Quarterbacks – Dan Pitcher; Running backs – Justin Hill; Wide receivers – Troy Walters; Assistant wide receivers – Brad Kragthorpe; Tight ends – James Casey; Offensive line/run game coordinator – Frank Pollack; Assistant offensive line – Derek Frazier; Assistant offensive line – Ben Martin	Defensive coaches: Defensive coordinator – Lou Anarumo; Defensive line – Marion Hobby; Linebackers – James Bettcher; Assistant linebackers – Jordan Kovacs; Secondary/cornerbacks – Charles Burks; Secondary/safeties – Robert Livingston; Senior defensive assistant – Mark Duffner; Defensive quality control – Louie Cioffi; Special teams coaches: Assistant special teams – Colt Anderson; Strength and conditioning: Strength and conditioning – Joey Boese; Assistant strength and conditioning – Todd Hunt; Assistant strength and conditioning – Garrett Swanson

== Final roster ==
2022 Cincinnati Bengals roster
Quarterbacks (QB): 8 Brandon Allen; 9 Joe Burrow; Running backs (RB): 25 Chris Evans; 28 Joe Mixon; 34 Samaje Perine; 32 Trayveon Williams; Wide receivers (WR): 83 Tyler Boyd; 1 Ja'Marr Chase; 85 Tee Higgins; 16 Trenton Irwin; 17 Stanley Morgan Jr.; 11 Trent Taylor; Tight ends (TE): 86 Devin Asiasi; 88 Hayden Hurst; 84 Mitchell Wilcox	Offensive linemen (OL): 77 Hakeem Adeniji T; 65 Alex Cappa G; 79 Jackson Carman T; 63 Trey Hill C/G; 64 Ted Karras C; 74 Max Scharping G; 70 D'Ante Smith T; 67 Cordell Volson G; 73 Jonah Williams T; Defensive linemen (DL): 95 Zachary Carter DT; 93 Jeffrey Gunter DE; 91 Trey Hendrickson DE; 92 B. J. Hill DT; 94 Sam Hubbard DE; 58 Joseph Ossai DE; 98 D. J. Reader DT; 96 Cameron Sample DE; 97 Jay Tufele DT; 68 Josh Tupou DT	Linebackers (LB): 49 Joe Bachie MLB; 51 Markus Bailey MLB; 59 Akeem Davis-Gaither OLB; 44 Clay Johnston OLB; 57 Germaine Pratt OLB; 55 Logan Wilson MLB; Defensive backs (DB): 20 Eli Apple CB; 30 Jessie Bates FS; 24 Vonn Bell SS; 35 Jalen Davis CB; 33 Tre Flowers CB; 42 Allan George CB; 23 Daxton Hill FS; 21 Mike Hilton CB; 29 Cam Taylor-Britt CB; 31 Michael Thomas SS; Special teams (ST): 48 Cal Adomitis LS; 4 Drue Chrisman P; 2 Evan McPherson K	Practice squad: 12 Tyron Billy-Johnson WR; 82 Nick Bowers TE; 6 Jake Browning QB; 90 Owen Carney DE; 76 Devin Cochran T; 37 Yusuf Corker SS; 72 Domenique Davis DT; 66 Nate Gilliam G; 10 Kevin Huber P; 87 Tanner Hudson TE; 69 Raymond Johnson DE; 47 Keandre Jones OLB; 18 Kwamie Lassiter II WR; 75 Isaiah Prince T; 39 Marvell Tell CB; Reserve: 26 Tycen Anderson FS (IR/DFR); 22 Chidobe Awuzie CB (IR); 62 Ben Brown C (IR); 71 La'el Collins T (IR); 46 Clark Harris LS (IR); 36 Elijah Holyfield RB (IR); 89 Drew Sample TE (IR); 40 Brandon Wilson FS (PUP); Rookies in italics 53 active, 8 reserve, 15 practice squad

== NFL Top 100 ==
Rank	Player	Position	Change
21	Joe Burrow	QB	NR
24	Ja'Marr Chase	WR	NR
38	Joe Mixon	RB	NR
78	Trey Hendrickson	DE	▼5

== Preseason ==
Week	Date	Opponent	Result	Record	Venue	Recap
1	August 12	Arizona Cardinals	L 23–36	0–1	Paycor Stadium	Recap
2	August 21	at New York Giants	L 22–25	0–2	MetLife Stadium	Recap
3	August 27	Los Angeles Rams	W 16–7	1–2	Paycor Stadium	Recap

== Regular season ==
=== Schedule ===
Week	Date	Opponent	Result	Record	Venue	Recap
1	September 11	**Pittsburgh Steelers**	**L** 20–23 (OT)	0–1	Paycor Stadium	Recap
2	September 18	at Dallas Cowboys	**L** 17–20	0–2	AT&T Stadium	Recap
3	September 25	at New York Jets	**W** 27–12	1–2	MetLife Stadium	Recap
4	September 29	Miami Dolphins	**W** 27–15	2–2	Paycor Stadium	Recap
5	October 9	at **Baltimore Ravens**	**L** 17–19	2–3	M&T Bank Stadium	Recap
6	October 16	at New Orleans Saints	**W** 30–26	3–3	Caesars Superdome	Recap
7	October 23	Atlanta Falcons	**W** 35–17	4–3	Paycor Stadium	Recap
8	October 31	at **Cleveland Browns**	**L** 13–32	4–4	FirstEnergy Stadium	Recap
9	November 6	Carolina Panthers	**W** 42–21	5–4	Paycor Stadium	Recap
10	Bye					
11	November 20	at **Pittsburgh Steelers**	**W** 37–30	6–4	Acrisure Stadium	Recap
12	November 27	at Tennessee Titans	**W** 20–16	7–4	Nissan Stadium	Recap
13	December 4	Kansas City Chiefs	**W** 27–24	8–4	Paycor Stadium	Recap
14	December 11	**Cleveland Browns**	**W** 23–10	9–4	Paycor Stadium	Recap
15	December 18	at Tampa Bay Buccaneers	**W** 34–23	10–4	Raymond James Stadium	Recap
16	December 24	at New England Patriots	**W** 22–18	11–4	Gillette Stadium	Recap
17	January 2	Buffalo Bills	No contest			
18	January 8	**Baltimore Ravens**	**W** 27–16	12–4	Paycor Stadium	Recap

Note: Intra-division opponents are in bold text.

=== Game summaries ===
==== Week 1: vs. Pittsburgh Steelers ====
Week 1: Pittsburgh Steelers at Cincinnati Bengals – Game summary

Quarter	1	2	3	4	OT	Total
**Steelers**	10	7	0	3	3	**23**
Bengals	3	3	8	6	0	**20**

at Paycor Stadium, Cincinnati, Ohio

- Date: September 11
- Game time: 1:00 p.m. EDT
- Game weather: Cloudy, 76 °F (24 °C)
- Game attendance: 65,841
- Referee: Shawn Hochuli
- TV announcers (CBS): Ian Eagle, Charles Davis and Evan Washburn
- Recap, Game Book

Game information

**First quarter**

- PIT – Minkah Fitzpatrick 31-yard interception return, (Chris Boswell kick), 12:43. Steelers 7–0. **Drive: 2 plays, −5 yards, 0:48.**
- CIN – Evan McPherson 59-yard field goal, 7:17. Steelers 7–3. **Drive: 10 plays, 34 yards, 5:26.**
- PIT – Chris Boswell 20-yard field goal, 2:25. Steelers 10–3. **Drive: 5 plays, 32 yards, 1:57.**

**Second quarter**

- PIT – Najee Harris 1-yard pass from Mitch Trubisky (Chris Boswell kick), 8:46. Steelers 17–3. **Drive: 7 plays, 59 yards, 4:22.**
- CIN – Evan McPherson 26-yard field goal, 0:14. Steelers 17–6. **Drive: 9 plays, 57 yards, 3:47.**

**Third quarter**

- CIN – Tyler Boyd 2-yard pass from Joe Burrow (Joe Burrow–Mike Thomas pass), 4:41. Steelers 17–14. **Drive: 9 plays, 46 yards, 5:44.**

**Fourth quarter**

- PIT – Chris Boswell 48-yard field goal, 11:13. Steelers 20–14. **Drive: 7 plays, 16 yards, 2:08.**
- CIN – Ja'Marr Chase 6-yard pass from Joe Burrow (kick blocked), 0:02. Tied 20–20. **Drive: 9 plays, 60 yards, 1:25.**

**Overtime**

- PIT – Chris Boswell 53-yard field goal, 0:00. Steelers 23–20. **Drive: 8 plays, 45 yards, 0:56.**

**Top passers**

- PIT – Mitchell Trubisky – 21/38, 194 yards, TD
- CIN – Joe Burrow – 33/53, 338 yards, 2 TD, 4 INT

**Top rushers**

- PIT – Chase Claypool – 6 rushes, 36 yards
- CIN – Joe Mixon – 27 rushes, 82 yards

**Top receivers**

- PIT – Pat Freiermuth – 5 receptions, 75 yards
- CIN – Ja’Marr Chase – 10 receptions, 129 yards, TD

The Bengals started the 2022 season against their division rival Steelers in Cincinnati. The Steelers scored first in the first quarter when Minkah Fitzpatrick returned an interception 31 yards for a touchdown to make it 7–0. The Bengals made it 7–3 when Evan McPherson made a 59-yard field goal which was the longest in franchise history. The Steelers then went ahead 10–3 after Chris Boswell kicked a 20-yard field goal. In the second quarter, the Steelers moved ahead 17–3 after Mitchell Trubisky found Najee Harris on a 1-yard touchdown pass. The Bengals drew closer at halftime when McPherson made a 26-yard field goal to make it 17–6. After the break, the Bengals came within 3 in the third quarter when Joe Burrow found Tyler Boyd on a 2-yard touchdown pass (with a successful 2-point conversion) to make it 17–14. In the fourth quarter, the Steelers moved ahead by 6 when Boswell kicked a 48-yard field goal to make it 20–14. Later on in the quarter, the Bengals tied the game when Burrow found Ja'Marr Chase on a 6-yard touchdown pass. (with a blocked PAT) to send the game into overtime tied at 20–20. After going back and forth on possessions, the Steelers managed to win the game when Boswell kicked the game winning 53-yard field goal with seconds left to make the final score 23–20.

With their 3-game winning streak against the Steelers snapped, the Bengals started the season 0–1. Wins by the Browns and Ravens would leave them at the bottom of the AFC North. Joe Burrow committed 5 turnovers throughout the course of the game (4 interceptions, 1 lost fumble).

==== Week 2: at Dallas Cowboys ====
Week 2: Cincinnati Bengals at Dallas Cowboys – Game summary

Quarter	1	2	3	4	Total
Bengals	3	0	6	8	**17**
**Cowboys**	14	3	0	3	**20**

at AT&T Stadium, Arlington, Texas

- Date: September 18
- Game time: 4:25 p.m. EDT/3:25 p.m. CDT
- Game weather: None (retractable roof closed)
- Game attendance: 92,944
- Referee: Brad Allen
- TV announcers (CBS): Jim Nantz, Tony Romo and Tracy Wolfson
- Recap, Game Book

Game information

**First quarter**

- DAL – Noah Brown 9-yard pass from Cooper Rush (Brett Maher kick), 8:35. Cowboys 7–0. **Drive: 12 plays, 75 yards, 6:25.**
- CIN – Evan McPherson 43-yard field goal, 3:05. Cowboys 7–3. **Drive: 9 plays, 50 yards, 5:30.**
- DAL – Tony Pollard 1-yard run (Brett Maher kick), 0:17. Cowboys 14–3. **Drive: 6 plays, 75 yards, 2:48.**

**Second quarter**

- DAL – Brett Maher 54-yard field goal, 0:09. Cowboys 17–3. **Drive: 6 plays, 13 yards, 0:42.**

**Third quarter**

- CIN – Evan McPherson 50-yard field goal, 9:41. Cowboys 17–6. **Drive: 11 plays, 43 yards, 5:19.**
- CIN – Evan McPherson 46-yard field goal, 4:05. Cowboys 17–9. **Drive: 7 plays, 31 yards, 3:55.**

**Fourth quarter**

- CIN – Tee Higgins 5-yard pass from Joe Burrow (Joe Burrow–Tyler Boyd pass), 3:45. Tied 17–17. **Drive: 7 plays, 16 yards, 2:08.**
- DAL – Brett Maher 50-yard field goal, 0:00. Cowboys 20–17. **Drive: 6 plays, 33 yards, 0:57.**

**Top passers**

- CIN – Joe Burrow – 24/36, 199 yards, TD
- DAL – Cooper Rush – 19/31, 235 yards, TD

**Top rushers**

- CIN – Joe Mixon – 19 rushes, 57 yards
- DAL – Ezekiel Elliott – 15 rushes, 53 yards

**Top receivers**

- PIT – Tee Higgins – 6 receptions, 71 yards, TD
- DAL – CeeDee Lamb – 7 receptions, 75 yards

Despite a fourth quarter comeback, the Bengals allowed the Cowboys to claim the win by marching down the field in the dying seconds of the game. With the loss, Cincinnati dropped to 0–2. This marked the third 0–2 start in four seasons, as well as the first team since the 2015 Seattle Seahawks to start 0–2 after playing in the Super Bowl the year prior. This also marked the first 0–2 start by a defending AFC champion since the 1999 Denver Broncos started 0–4 after winning Super Bowl XXXIII. The Bengals once again failed to beat the Cowboys, not having done so since 2004, and extended their losing streak against them to five games.

==== Week 3: at New York Jets ====
Week 3: Cincinnati Bengals at New York Jets – Game summary

Quarter	1	2	3	4	Total
**Bengals**	14	6	7	0	**27**
Jets	6	3	3	0	**12**

at MetLife Stadium, East Rutherford, New Jersey

- Date: September 25
- Game time: 1:00 p.m. EDT
- Game weather: Mostly cloudy, 66 °F (19 °C)
- Game attendance: 73,708
- Referee: Jerome Boger
- TV announcers (CBS): Ian Eagle, Charles Davis and Evan Washburn
- Recap, Game Book

Game information

**First quarter**

- CIN – Samaje Perine 12-yard pass from Joe Burrow (Evan McPherson kick), 9:35. Bengals 7–0. **Drive: 11 plays, 75 yards, 5:25.**
- NYJ – Greg Zuerlein 50-yard field goal, 5:04. Bengals 7–3. **Drive: 9 plays, 43 yards, 4:31.**
- NYJ – Greg Zuerlein 40-yard field goal, 1:49. Bengals 7–6. **Drive: 5 plays, 21 yards, 1:26.**
- CIN – Tyler Boyd 56-yard pass from Joe Burrow (Evan McPherson kick), 0:00. Bengals 14–6. **Drive: 5 plays, 75 yards, 1:49.**

**Second quarter**

- CIN – Evan McPherson 22-yard field goal, 7:48. Bengals 17–6. **Drive: 7 plays, 71 yards, 2:25.**
- CIN – Evan McPherson 43-yard field goal, 5:28. Bengals 20–6. **Drive: 4 plays, 0 yards, 0:58.**
- NYJ – Greg Zuerlein 52-yard field goal, 0:00. Bengals 20–9. **Drive: 6 plays, 13 yards, 0:30.**

**Third quarter**

- CIN – Ja'Marr Chase 5-yard pass from Joe Burrow (Evan McPherson kick), 12:02. Bengals 27–9. **Drive: 4 plays, 24 yards, 2:06.**
- NYJ – Greg Zuerlein 43-yard field goal, 0:41. Bengals 27–12. **Drive: 12 plays, 55 yards, 3:32.**

**Fourth quarter**

- No scoring plays.

**Top passers**

- CIN – Joe Burrow – 23/36, 275 yards, 3 TD
- NYJ – Joe Flacco – 28/52, 285 yards, 2 INT

**Top rushers**

- CIN – Samaje Perine – 9 rushes, 47 yards
- NYJ – Michael Carter – 11 rushes, 39 yards

**Top receivers**

- CIN – Jamarr Chase – 6 receptions, 29 yards, TD
- NYJ – Tyler Conklin – 8 receptions, 84 yards

After a disappointing 0–2 start to the season, the Bengals bounced back with a win against the Jets. Trey Hendrickson had 2.5 sacks, including 2 forced fumbles, and Joe Burrow threw for 275 yards and 3 touchdowns with no interceptions, preventing an 0–3 start.

==== Week 4: vs. Miami Dolphins ====
Week 4: Miami Dolphins at Cincinnati Bengals – Game summary

Quarter	1	2	3	4	Total
Dolphins	3	9	3	0	**15**
**Bengals**	7	7	0	13	**27**

at Paycor Stadium, Cincinnati, Ohio

- Date: September 29
- Game time: 8:15 p.m. EDT
- Game weather: Clear, 61 °F (16 °C)
- Game attendance: 67,260
- Referee: Tra Blake
- TV announcers (WCPO/Prime Video): Al Michaels, Kirk Herbstreit and Kaylee Hartung
- Recap, Game Book

Game information

**First quarter**

- CIN – Joe Mixon 5-yard run (Evan McPherson kick), 10:19. Bengals 7–0. **Drive: 9 plays, 75 yards, 4:41.**
- MIA – Jason Sanders 23-yard field goal, 6:05. Bengals 7–3. **Drive: 9 plays, 70 yards, 4:14.**

**Second quarter**

- MIA – Jason Sanders 48-yard field goal, 7:31. Bengals 7–6. **Drive: 8 plays, 46 yards, 3:08.**
- CIN – Tee Higgins 59-yard pass from Joe Burrow (Evan McPherson kick), 2:50. Bengals 14–6. **Drive: 3 plays, 58 yards, 1:32.**
- MIA – Chase Edmonds 7-yard pass from Teddy Bridgewater (kick failed), 0:09. Bengals 14–12. **Drive: 9 plays, 75 yards, 2:41.**

**Third quarter**

- MIA – Jason Sanders 20-yard field goal, 2:40. Dolphins 15–14. **Drive: 7 plays, 88 yards, 3:38.**

**Fourth quarter**

- CIN – Evan McPherson 19-yard field goal, 12:00. Bengals 17–15. **Drive: 9 plays, 74 yards, 5:50.**
- CIN – Evan McPherson 57-yard field goal, 6:13. Bengals 20–15. **Drive: 8 plays, 33 yards, 3:36.**
- CIN – Hayden Hurst 2-yard pass from Joe Burrow (Evan McPherson kick), 1:52. Bengals 27–15. **Drive: 5 plays, 45 yards, 1:13.**

**Top passers**

- MIA – Teddy Bridgewater – 14/23, 193 yards, TD, INT
- CIN – Joe Burrow – 20/31, 287 yards, 2 TD

**Top rushers**

- MIA – Raheem Mostert – 15 rushes, 69 yards
- CIN – Joe Mixon – 24 rushes, 61 yards, TD

**Top receivers**

- MIA – Tyreek Hill – 10 receptions, 160 yards, TD
- CIN – Tee Higgins – 7 receptions, 124 yards, TD

On Thursday Night Football, the Bengals defeated the Miami Dolphins 27–15. The Bengals had a quick start, getting a touchdown in the first possession of the game from Joe Mixon. The Bengals defense also held the Dolphins offense to 1 touchdown.

==== Week 5: at Baltimore Ravens ====
Week 5: Cincinnati Bengals at Baltimore Ravens – Game summary

Quarter	1	2	3	4	Total
Bengals	0	10	0	7	**17**
**Ravens**	3	7	3	6	**19**

at M&T Bank Stadium, Baltimore, Maryland

- Date: October 9
- Game time: 8:20 p.m. EDT
- Game weather: Clear, 60 °F (16 °C)
- Game attendance: 70,548
- Referee: Scott Novak
- TV announcers (NBC): Mike Tirico, Cris Collinsworth and Melissa Stark
- Recap, Game Book

Game information

**First quarter**

- BAL – Justin Tucker 37-yard field goal, 8:03. Ravens 3–0. **Drive: 10 plays, 51 yards, 4:54.**

**Second quarter**

- BAL – Mark Andrews 11-yard pass from Lamar Jackson (Justin Tucker kick), 13:26. Ravens 10–0. **Drive: 7 plays, 50 yards, 2:55.**
- CIN – Hayden Hurst 19-yard pass from Joe Burrow (Evan McPherson kick), 4:54. Ravens 10–7. **Drive: 7 plays, 83 yards, 4:24.**
- CIN – Evan McPherson 40-yard field goal, 0:04. Tied 10–10. **Drive: 11 plays, 62 yards, 1:50.**

**Third quarter**

- BAL – Justin Tucker 58-yard field goal, 10:49. Ravens 13–10. **Drive: 4 plays, 6 yards, 1:35.**
- BAL – Justin Tucker 25-yard field goal, 9:42. Ravens 16–10. **Drive: 15 plays, 91 yards, 8:03.**

**Fourth quarter**

- CIN – Joe Burrow 1-yard run (Evan McPherson kick), 1:58. Bengals 17–16. **Drive: 13 plays, 75 yards, 7:44.**
- BAL – Justin Tucker 43-yard field goal, 0:00. Ravens 19–17. **Drive: 7 plays, 50 yards, 1:58.**

**Top passers**

- CIN – Joe Burrow – 24/35, 217 yards, TD, INT
- BAL – Lamar Jackson – 19/32, 174 yards, TD, INT

**Top rushers**

- CIN – Joe Mixon – 14 rushes, 78 yards
- BAL – Lamar Jackson – 12 rushes, 58 yards

**Top receivers**

- CIN – Hayden Hurst – 6 receptions, 53 yards, TD
- BAL – Mark Andrews – 8 receptions, 89 yards, TD

In a primetime showdown on NBC, the Ravens won on a crucial 43-yard Justin Tucker field goal. With the loss, the Bengals dropped to 2–3.

==== Week 6: at New Orleans Saints ====
Week 6: Cincinnati Bengals at New Orleans Saints – Game summary

Quarter	1	2	3	4	Total
**Bengals**	7	7	7	9	**30**
Saints	7	13	3	3	**26**

at Caesars Superdome, New Orleans, Louisiana

- Date: October 16
- Game time: 1:00 p.m. EDT/12:00 p.m. CDT
- Game weather: None (indoor stadium)
- Game attendance: 70,004
- Referee: Land Clark
- TV announcers (CBS): Greg Gumbel, Adam Archuleta and AJ Ross
- Recap, Game Book

Game information

**First quarter**

- NO – Tre'Quan Smith 18-yard pass from Andy Dalton (Wil Lutz kick), 10:33. Saints 7–0. **Drive: 3 plays, 32 yards, 1:25.**
- CIN – Joe Mixon 9-yard pass from Joe Burrow (Evan McPherson kick), 0:45. Tied 7–7. **Drive: 12 plays, 75 yards, 5:55.**

**Second quarter**

- NO – Rashid Shaheed 44-yard run (Wil Lutz kick), 13:39. Saints 14–7. **Drive: 5 plays, 75 yards, 2:06.**
- NO – Wil Lutz 35-yard field goal, 10:28. Saints 17–7. **Drive: 6 plays, 59 yards, 2:11.**
- CIN – Joe Burrow 19-yard run (Evan McPherson kick), 5:44. Saints 17–14. **Drive: 10 plays, 75 yards, 4:44.**
- NO – Wil Lutz 30-yard field goal, 0:01. Saints 20–14. **Drive: 14 plays, 63 yards, 5:43.**

**Third quarter**

- NO – Wil Lutz 37-yard field goal, 7:12. Saints 23–14. **Drive: 14 plays, 56 yards, 7:48.**
- CIN – Ja'Marr Chase 15-yard pass from Joe Burrow (Evan McPherson kick), 3:30. Saints 23–21. **Drive: 7 plays, 74 yards, 3:42.**

**Fourth quarter**

- NO – Wil Lutz 31-yard field goal, 11:07. Saints 26–21. **Drive: 14 plays, 66 yards, 7:23.**
- CIN – Evan McPherson 52-yard field goal, 3:42. Saints 26–24. **Drive: 13 plays, 41 yards, 7:25.**
- CIN – Ja'Marr Chase 60-yard pass from Joe Burrow (pass failed), 1:57. Bengals 30–26. **Drive: 1 play, 60 yards, 0:13.**

**Top passers**

- CIN – Joe Burrow – 28/37, 300 yards, 3 TD
- NO – Andy Dalton – 17/32, 162 yards, TD

**Top rushers**

- CIN – Joe Mixon – 8 rushes, 45 yards
- NO – Alvin Kamara – 19 rushes, 99 yards

**Top receivers**

- CIN – Ja'Marr Chase – 7 receptions, 132 yards, 2 TD
- NO – Tre'Quan Smith – 3 receptions, 43 yards, TD

With 1:57 left on the clock and a 2-point deficit, Joe Burrow connected with Ja'Marr Chase for a 60-yard touchdown, essentially winning the game. With the win, the Bengals improved to 3–3 and returned to .500

==== Week 7: vs. Atlanta Falcons ====
Week 7: Atlanta Falcons at Cincinnati Bengals – Game summary

Quarter	1	2	3	4	Total
Falcons	0	17	0	0	**17**
**Bengals**	14	14	7	0	**35**

at Paycor Stadium, Cincinnati, Ohio

- Date: October 23
- Game time: 1:00 p.m. EDT
- Game weather: Sunny, 73 °F (23 °C)
- Game attendance: 66,158
- Referee: Clete Blakeman
- TV announcers (Fox): Brandon Gaudin, Robert Smith and Jen Hale
- Recap, Game Book

Game information

**First quarter**

- CIN – Tyler Boyd 60-yard pass from Joe Burrow (Evan McPherson kick), 13:00. Bengals 7–0. **Drive: 4 plays, 84 yards, 2:00.**
- CIN – Joe Mixon 1-yard run (Evan McPherson kick), 4:51. Bengals 14–0. **Drive: 11 plays, 71 yards, 5:13.**

**Second quarter**

- CIN – Ja'Marr Chase 32-yard pass from Joe Burrow (Evan McPherson kick), 14:55. Bengals 21–0. **Drive: 6 plays, 75 yards, 3:20.**
- ATL – Tyler Allgeier 1-yard run (Younghoe Koo kick), 4:46. Bengals 21–7. **Drive: 16 plays, 75 yards, 10:09.**
- CIN – Ja'Marr Chase 41-yard pass from Joe Burrow (Evan McPherson kick), 0:49. Bengals 28–7. **Drive: 7 plays, 84 yards, 3:57.**
- ATL – Damiere Byrd 75-yard pass from Marcus Mariota (Younghoe Koo kick), 0:39. Bengals 28–14. **Drive: 1 play, 75 yards, 0:10.**
- ATL – Younghoe Koo 43-yard field goal, 0:00. Bengals 28–17. **Drive: 1 play, 0 yards, 0:03.**

**Third quarter**

- CIN – Joe Burrow 1-yard run (Evan McPherson kick), 5:20. Bengals 35–17. **Drive: 7 plays, 62 yards, 3:44.**

**Fourth quarter**

- No scoring plays.

**Top passers**

- ATL – Marcus Mariota – 8/13, 124 yards, TD
- CIN – Joe Burrow – 34/42, 481 yards, 3 TD

**Top rushers**

- ATL – Tyler Allgeier – 16 rushes, 50 yards, TD
- CIN – Joe Mixon – 17 rushes, 58 yards, TD

**Top receivers**

- ATL – Damiere Byrd – 1 reception, 75 yards, TD
- CIN – Tyler Boyd – 8 receptions, 155 yards, TD

The Bengals jumped out to a 28–17 halftime lead before scoring the only points in the second half to make it 35–17 and improved to 4–3.

==== Week 8: at Cleveland Browns ====
Week 8: Cincinnati Bengals at Cleveland Browns – Game summary

Quarter	1	2	3	4	Total
Bengals	0	0	0	13	**13**
**Browns**	0	11	14	7	**32**

at FirstEnergy Stadium, Cleveland, Ohio

- Date: October 31
- Game time: 8:15 p.m. EDT
- Game weather: Cloudy, 66 °F (19 °C)
- Game attendance: 67,431
- Referee: Bill Vinovich
- TV announcers (WCPO/ESPN): Joe Buck, Troy Aikman and Lisa Salters
- Recap, Game Book

Game information

**First quarter**

- No scoring plays.

**Second quarter**

- CLE – Nick Chubb 3-yard run (Nick Chubb run), 5:04. Browns 8–0. **Drive: 10 plays, 78 yards, 5:45.**
- CLE – Cade York 55-yard field goal, 0:00. Browns 11–0. **Drive: 6 plays, 26 yards, 0:40.**

**Third quarter**

- CLE – Jacoby Brissett 3-yard run (Cade York kick), 8:57. Browns 18–0. **Drive: 11 plays, 75 yards, 6:03.**
- CLE – Amari Cooper 4-yard pass from Jacoby Brissett (Cade York kick), 3:10. Browns 25–0. **Drive: 8 plays, 60 yards, 4:17.**

**Fourth quarter**

- CIN – Tyler Boyd 13-yard pass from Joe Burrow (kick failed), 14:15. Browns 25–6. **Drive: 9 plays, 73 yards, 3:55.**
- CLE – Nick Chubb 11-yard run (Cade York kick), 8:46. Browns 32–6. **Drive: 8 plays, 83 yards, 5:29.**
- CIN – Tee Higgins 41-yard pass from Joe Burrow (Evan McPherson kick), 6:40. Browns 32–13. **Drive: 5 plays, 75 yards, 2:06.**

**Top passers**

- CIN – Joe Burrow – 25/35, 232 yards, 2 TD, INT
- CLE – Jacoby Brissett – 17/22, 278 yards, TD

**Top rushers**

- CIN – Joe Mixon – 8 rushes, 27 yards
- CLE – Nick Chubb – 23 rushes, 101 yards, 2 TD

**Top receivers**

- CIN – Tee Higgins – 3 reception, 49 yards, TD
- CLE – Amari Cooper – 5 receptions, 131 yards, TD

In the 2022 Battle of Ohio Round 1, the Browns made it an 11–0 halftime lead, scoring all the first half points in the second quarter. After the third quarter, they had made it 25–0. The Bengals finally got on the board in the fourth quarter, making it 25–6 by way of Joe Burrow's 13-yard touchdown pass to Tyler Boyd (with a failed PAT). Though, the Browns scored again, making it 32–6 with Nick Chubb's 11-yard touchdown run. Joe Burrow connected with Tee Higgins on a 41-yard touchdown pass for the final points of the game, making it 32–13.

The loss dropped the Bengals to 4–4. Joe Burrow's personal starting record against the Browns dropped to 0–4. This was the Bengals' only loss of the season by more than 3 points.

==== Week 9: vs. Carolina Panthers ====
Week 9: Carolina Panthers at Cincinnati Bengals – Game summary

Quarter	1	2	3	4	Total
Panthers	0	0	7	14	**21**
**Bengals**	7	28	7	0	**42**

at Paycor Stadium, Cincinnati, Ohio

- Date: November 6
- Game time: 1:00 p.m. EST
- Game weather: Sunny, 70 °F (21 °C)
- Game attendance: 66,160
- Referee: Alex Kemp
- TV announcers (Fox): Kevin Kugler, Mark Sanchez and Laura Okmin
- Recap, Game Book

Game information

**First quarter**

- CIN – Joe Mixon 2-yard run (Evan McPherson kick), 9:42. Bengals 7–0. **Drive: 9 plays, 90 yards, 5:18.**

**Second quarter**

- CIN – Joe Burrow 1-yard run (Evan McPherson kick), 14:37. Bengals 14–0. **Drive: 10 plays, 71 yards, 5:50.**
- CIN – Joe Mixon 3-yard run (Evan McPherson kick), 7:29. Bengals 21–0. **Drive: 9 plays, 59 yards, 5:09.**
- CIN – Joe Mixon 1-yard run (Evan McPherson kick), 3:45. Bengals 28–0. **Drive: 5 plays, 42 yards, 2:51.**
- CIN – Joe Mixon 12-yard pass from Joe Burrow (Evan McPherson kick), 0:04. Bengals 35–0. **Drive: 5 plays, 23 yards, 1:05.**

**Third quarter**

- CAR – Tommy Tremble 8-yard pass from Baker Mayfield (Eddy Piñeiro kick), 10:52. Bengals 35–7. **Drive: 8 plays, 37 yards, 4:08.**
- CIN – Joe Mixon 14-yard run (Evan McPherson kick), 4:38. Bengals 42–7. **Drive: 11 plays, 75 yards, 6:14.**

**Fourth quarter**

- CAR – Terrace Marshall Jr. 21-yard pass from Baker Mayfield (Eddy Piñeiro kick), 7:47. Bengals 42–14. **Drive: 10 plays, 56 yards, 5:01.**
- CAR – Raheem Blackshear 2-yard run (Eddy Piñeiro kick), 1:29. Bengals 42–21. **Drive: 10 plays, 62 yards, 2:18.**

**Top passers**

- CAR – Baker Mayfield – 14/20, 155 yards, 2 TD
- CIN – Joe Burrow – 22/28, 206 yards, TD

**Top rushers**

- CAR – D'Onta Foreman – 7 rushes, 23 yards
- CIN – Joe Mixon – 22 rushes, 153 yards, 4 TD

**Top receivers**

- CAR – Terrace Marshall Jr. – 3 reception, 53 yards, TD
- CIN – Tee Higgins – 7 receptions, 60 yards

The Bengals jumped out to lead 35–0 at halftime before the Panthers finally got on the board in the third with Baker Mayfield's 8-yard touchdown pass to Tommy Tremble, making it 35–7. The Bengals made it 42–7 by way of Joe Mixon's 14-yard touchdown run. The Panthers scored the remaining points in the fourth, making the final score 42–21.

The Bengals were able to go into their bye week 5–4, which was coincidentally the same record they had in the first 9 games on the previous season.

==== Week 11: at Pittsburgh Steelers ====
Week 11: Cincinnati Bengals at Pittsburgh Steelers – Game summary

Quarter	1	2	3	4	Total
**Bengals**	10	7	10	10	**37**
Steelers	3	17	3	7	**30**

at Acrisure Stadium, Pittsburgh, Pennsylvania

- Date: November 20
- Game time: 4:25 p.m. EST
- Game weather: Mostly sunny, 32 °F (0 °C)
- Game attendance: 66,401
- Referee: Brad Allen
- TV announcers (CBS): Greg Gumbel, Adam Archuleta and AJ Ross
- Recap, Game Book

Game information

**First quarter**

- CIN – Evan McPherson 45-yard field goal, 8:54. Bengals 3–0. **Drive: 5 plays, 30 yards, 2:09.**
- PIT – Matthew Wright 42-yard field goal, 4:37. Tied 3–3. **Drive: 9 plays, 41 yards, 4:17.**
- CIN – Samaje Perine 29-yard pass from Joe Burrow (Evan McPherson kick), 0:39. Bengals 10–3. **Drive: 6 plays, 79 yards, 3:58.**

**Second quarter**

- PIT – Najee Harris 19-yard run (Matthew Wright kick), 12:58. Tied 10–10. **Drive: 8 plays, 56 yards, 2:41.**
- CIN – Samaje Perine 11-yard pass from Joe Burrow (Evan McPherson kick), 6:38. Bengals 17–10. **Drive: 10 plays, 92 yards, 6:20.**
- PIT – George Pickens 24-yard pass from Kenny Pickett (Matthew Wright kick), 1:47. Tied 17–17. **Drive: 10 plays, 65 yards, 4:51.**
- PIT – Matthew Wright 30-yard field goal, 0:00. Steelers 20–17. **Drive: 5 plays, 44 yards, 0:31.**

**Third quarter**

- CIN – Trenton Irwin 1-yard pass from Joe Burrow (Evan McPherson kick), 7:02. Bengals 24–20. **Drive: 7 plays, 59 yards, 3:05.**
- PIT – Matthew Wright 34-yard field goal, 4:28. Bengals 24–23. **Drive: 4 plays, 6 yards, 0:55.**
- CIN – Evan McPherson 54-yard field goal, 0:31. Bengals 27–23. **Drive: 9 plays, 22 yards, 3:57.**

**Fourth quarter**

- CIN – Samaje Perine 6-yard pass from Joe Burrow (Evan McPherson kick), 4:30. Bengals 34–23. **Drive: 8 plays, 93 yards, 5:03.**
- CIN – Evan McPherson 44-yard field goal, 3:18. Bengals 37–23. **Drive: 4 plays, 2 yards, 0:17.**
- PIT – Najee Harris 1-yard run (Matthew Wright kick), 0:45. Bengals 37–30. **Drive: 9 plays, 72 yards, 2:33.**

**Top passers**

- CIN – Joe Burrow – 24/39, 355 yards, 4 TD, 2 INT
- PIT – Kenny Pickett – 25/42, 265 yards, TD

**Top rushers**

- CIN – Samaje Perine – 11 rushes, 30 yards
- PIT – Najee Harris – 20 rushes, 90 yards, 2 TD

**Top receivers**

- CIN – Tee Higgins – 9 receptions, 148 yards
- PIT – George Pickens – 4 receptions, 83 yards, TD

Coming off of their bye week, the Bengals traveled for Round 2 against the Steelers. In the first quarter, the Bengals scored first when Evan McPherson kicked a 45-yard field goal to make it 3–0. The Steelers then tied it up when Matthew Wright kicked a 42-yard field goal to make it 3–3. The Bengals then moved back into the lead when Joe Burrow found Samaje Perine on a 29-yard touchdown pass to make it 10–3. In the second quarter, the Steelers tied the game up at 10–10 when Najee Harris ran for a 19-yard touchdown. The Bengals then moved into the lead again when Burrow and Perine connected on a 11-yard touchdown pass to make it 17–10. The Steelers were able to tie it up at 17–17 when Kenny Pickett found George Pickens on a 24-yard touchdown pass. They took the lead at halftime 20–17 when Wright kicked a 30-yard field goal. In the third quarter, the Bengals retook the lead when Burrow found Trenton Irwin on a 1-yard touchdown pass to make it 24–20. The Steelers drew closer when Wright kicked a 34-yard field goal to make it 24–23. The Bengals then pulled away when McPherson kicked a 54-yard field goal to make it 27–23. In the fourth quarter, the Bengals scored a couple more times including a touchdown where Burrow and Perine connected for the third time on a 6-yard touchdown pass for a 34–23 lead and then McPherson kicked a 44-yard field goal to make it 37–23. The Steelers concluded the scoring of the game when Harris ran for a 1-yard touchdown. After a failed onside kick, the Bengals won with a final score of 37–30.

With the win, the Bengals improved to 6–4.

==== Week 12: at Tennessee Titans ====
Week 12: Cincinnati Bengals at Tennessee Titans – Game summary

Quarter	1	2	3	4	Total
**Bengals**	0	10	3	7	**20**
Titans	0	10	3	3	**16**

at Nissan Stadium, Nashville, Tennessee

- Date: November 27
- Game time: 1:00 p.m. EST/12:00 p.m. CST
- Game weather: Cloudy, 55 °F (13 °C)
- Game attendance: 69,441
- Referee: Carl Cheffers
- TV announcers (CBS): Ian Eagle, Charles Davis and Evan Washburn
- Recap, Game Book

Game information

**First quarter**

- No scoring plays.

**Second quarter**

- TEN – Caleb Shudak 33-yard field goal, 14:06. Titans 3–0. **Drive: 10 plays, 39 yards, 4:01.**
- CIN – Evan McPherson 47-yard field goal, 11:30. Tied 3–3. **Drive: 7 plays, 47 yards, 2:36.**
- TEN – Treylon Burks fumble recovery in end zone (Caleb Shudak kick), 11:15. Titans 10–3.
- CIN – Samaje Perine 7-yard run (Evan McPherson kick), 1:55. Tied 10–10. **Drive: 9 plays, 92 yards, 5:34.**

**Third quarter**

- CIN – Evan McPherson 38-yard field goal, 2:35. Bengals 13–10. **Drive: 14 plays, 60 yards, 5:19.**
- TEN – Caleb Shudak 24-yard field goal, 0:39. Tied 13–13. **Drive: 15 plays, 69 yards, 1:56.**

**Fourth quarter**

- CIN – Tee Higgins 27-yard pass from Joe Burrow (Evan McPherson kick), 13:42. Bengals 20–13. **Drive: 6 plays, 75 yards, 1:57.**
- TEN – Caleb Shudak 38-yard field goal, 6:07. Bengals 20–16. **Drive: 12 plays, 55 yards, 7:35.**

**Top passers**

- CIN – Joe Burrow – 22/37, 270 yards, TD
- TEN – Ryan Tannehill – 22/34, 291 yards

**Top rushers**

- CIN – Samaje Perine – 17 rushes, 58 yards, TD
- TEN – Derrick Henry – 17 rushes, 38 yards

**Top receivers**

- CIN – Tee Higgins – 7 receptions, 114 yards, TD
- TEN – Derrick Henry – 3 receptions, 79 yards

After a close win, the Bengals traveled again to take on the Titans. The game was tied at 10–10 at halftime. In the third quarter, Evan McPherson kicked a 38-yard field goal to make it 13–10 Bengals before the Titans tied it up at 13–13 with Caleb Shudak's 24-yard field goal. The Bengals moved up 20–13 when Joe Burrow connected with Tee Higgins on a 27-yard touchdown pass. The Titans countered with another 38-yard field goal by Shudak. After getting stopped in the red zone, the Bengals kicked a field goal to make the score 23–16. However, a personal foul against the Titans took back the field goal and resulted into an automatic first down, ending the game and making the final score 20–16.

With the win, the Bengals improved to 7–4.

==== Week 13: vs. Kansas City Chiefs ====
Week 13: Kansas City Chiefs at Cincinnati Bengals – Game summary

Quarter	1	2	3	4	Total
Chiefs	3	7	14	0	**24**
**Bengals**	7	7	3	10	**27**

at Paycor Stadium, Cincinnati, Ohio

- Date: December 4
- Game time: 4:25 p.m. EST
- Game weather: Sunny, 41 °F (5 °C)
- Game attendance: 66,243
- Referee: John Hussey
- TV announcers (CBS): Jim Nantz, Tony Romo and Tracy Wolfson
- Recap, Game Book

Game information

**First quarter**

- CIN – Joe Burrow 4-yard run (Evan McPherson kick), 8:49. Bengals 7–0. **Drive: 11 plays, 75 yards, 6:11.**
- KC – Harrison Butker 26-yard field goal, 3:56. Bengals 7–3. **Drive: 10 plays, 65 yards, 4:53.**

**Second quarter**

- CIN – Tee Higgins 12-yard pass from Joe Burrow (Evan McPherson kick), 13:33. Bengals 14–3. **Drive: 9 plays, 74 yards, 5:23.**
- KC – Jerick McKinnon 2-yard pass from Patrick Mahomes (Harrison Butker kick), 2:23. Bengals 14–10. **Drive: 14 plays, 81 yards, 7:05.**

**Third quarter**

- KC – Isiah Pacheco 8-yard run (Harrison Butker kick), 12:03. Chiefs 17–14. **Drive: 7 plays, 77 yards, 2:57.**
- CIN – Evan McPherson 36-yard field goal, 7:16. Tied 17–17. **Drive: 9 plays, 57 yards, 4:47.**
- KC – Patrick Mahomes 3-yard run (Harrison Butker kick), 3:49. Chiefs 24–17. **Drive: 8 plays, 53 yards, 3:27.**

**Fourth quarter**

- CIN – Evan McPherson 41-yard field goal, 14:47. Chiefs 24–20. **Drive: 8 plays, 52 yards, 4:02.**
- CIN – Chris Evans 8-yard pass from Joe Burrow (Evan McPherson kick), 8:54. Bengals 27–24. **Drive: 10 plays, 53 yards, 4:58.**

**Top passers**

- KC – Patrick Mahomes – 16/27, 223 yards, TD
- CIN – Joe Burrow – 25/31, 286 yards, 2 TD

**Top rushers**

- KC – Isiah Pacheco – 14 rushes, 66 yards, TD
- CIN – Samaje Perine – 21 rushes, 106 yards

**Top receivers**

- KC – Marquez Valdes-Scantling – 2 receptions, 71 yards
- CIN – Ja'Marr Chase – 7 receptions, 97 yards

The Bengals then went home to take on the 9–2 Chiefs. After leading 14–10 at halftime, the Chiefs took a 17–14 lead in the third quarter by way of Isiah Pacheco's 8-yard touchdown run. The Bengals then tied it up at 17–17 when Evan McPherson kicked a 36-yard field goal. Patrick Mahomes then ran for a 3-yard touchdown to put the Chiefs back on top 24–17. The Bengals scored the remaining points in the fourth quarter with McPherson's 41-yard field goal, making it 24–20 and taking the lead with Joe Burrow's 8-yard touchdown pass to Chris Evans. After a missed 55-yard field goal by Harrison Butker, the Bengals faced 3rd and 11. The Bengals converted, making the final score 27–24.

The Bengals improved to 8–4 with the upset win, and extended their winning streak in Cincinnati against the Chiefs to seven games. Joe Burrow's personal starting record against Patrick Mahomes improved to 3–0.

==== Week 14: vs. Cleveland Browns ====
Week 14: Cleveland Browns at Cincinnati Bengals – Game summary

Quarter	1	2	3	4	Total
Browns	0	3	7	0	**10**
**Bengals**	0	13	7	3	**23**

at Paycor Stadium, Cincinnati, Ohio

- Date: December 11
- Game time: 1:00 p.m. EST
- Game weather: Mostly cloudy, 48 °F (9 °C)
- Game attendance: 66,222
- Referee: Jerome Boger
- TV announcers (CBS): Greg Gumbel, Adam Archuleta and AJ Ross
- Recap, Game Book

Game information

**First quarter**

- No scoring plays.

**Second quarter**

- CIN – Ja'Marr Chase 15-yard pass from Joe Burrow (Evan McPherson kick), 9:43. Bengals 7–0. **Drive: 9 plays, 85 yards, 5:03.**
- CLE – Cade York 26-yard field goal, 2:59. Bengals 7–3. **Drive: 13 plays, 63 yards, 6:44.**
- CIN – Samaje Perine 6-yard run (kick failed), 0:24. Bengals 13–3. **Drive: 9 plays, 75 yards, 2:35.**

**Third quarter**

- CIN – Trenton Irwin 45-yard pass from Joe Burrow (Evan McPherson kick), 7:26. Bengals 20–3. **Drive: 2 plays, 56 yards, 0:44.**
- CLE – David Njoku 13-yard pass from Deshaun Watson (Cade York kick), 2:17. Bengals 20–10. **Drive: 10 plays, 71 yards, 5:09.**

**Fourth quarter**

- CIN – Evan McPherson 30-yard field goal, 14:57. Bengals 23–10. **Drive: 6 plays, 63 yards, 2:20.**

**Top passers**

- CLE – Deshaun Watson – 26/42, 276 yards, TD, INT
- CIN – Joe Burrow – 18/33, 239 yards, 2 TD, INT

**Top rushers**

- CLE – Nick Chubb – 14 rushes, 34 yards
- CIN – Joe Mixon – 14 rushes, 96 yards

**Top receivers**

- CLE – Donovan Peoples-Jones – 8 receptions, 114 yards
- CIN – Ja'Marr Chase – 10 receptions, 119 yards, TD

==== Week 15: at Tampa Bay Buccaneers ====
Week 15: Cincinnati Bengals at Tampa Bay Buccaneers – Game summary

Quarter	1	2	3	4	Total
**Bengals**	0	3	17	14	**34**
Buccaneers	3	14	0	6	**23**

at Raymond James Stadium, Tampa, Florida

- Date: December 18
- Game time: 4:25 p.m. EST
- Game weather: Clear, 67 °F (19 °C)
- Game attendance: 69,305
- Referee: Adrian Hill
- TV announcers (CBS): Jim Nantz, Tony Romo and Tracy Wolfson
- Recap, Game Book

Game information

**First quarter**

- TB – Ryan Succop 21-yard field goal, 6:06. Buccaneers 3–0. **Drive: 13 plays, 67 yards, 6:20.**

**Second quarter**

- TB – Russell Gage 1-yard pass from Tom Brady (Ryan Succop kick), 14:11. Buccaneers 10–0. **Drive: 11 plays, 59 yards, 4:47.**
- TB – Chris Godwin 5-yard pass from Tom Brady (Ryan Succop kick), 1:39. Buccaneers 17–0. **Drive: 10 plays, 85 yards, 4:51.**
- CIN – Evan McPherson 41-yard field goal, 0:00. Buccaneers 17–3. **Drive: 7 plays, 47 yards, 1:39.**

**Third quarter**

- CIN – Evan McPherson 21-yard field goal, 12:04. Buccaneers 17–6. **Drive: 5 plays, 13 yards, 1:27.**
- CIN – Tee Higgins 5-yard pass from Joe Burrow (pass failed), 5:42. Buccaneers 17–12. **Drive: 7 plays, 31 yards, 3:54.**
- CIN – Tyler Boyd 3-yard pass from Joe Burrow (Joe Burrow-Tee Higgins pass), 2:40. Bengals 20–17. **Drive: 5 plays, 13 yards, 2:16.**

**Fourth quarter**

- CIN – Ja'Marr Chase 8-yard pass from Joe Burrow (Evan McPherson kick), 12:45. Bengals 27–17. **Drive: 8 plays, 39 yards, 3:33.**
- CIN – Mitchell Wilcox 12-yard pass from Joe Burrow (Evan McPherson kick), 2:21. Bengals 34–17. **Drive: 13 plays, 62 yards, 6:57.**
- TB – Russell Gage 5-yard pass from Tom Brady (pass failed), 0:49. Bengals 34–23. **Drive: 9 plays, 75 yards, 1:32.**

**Top passers**

- CIN – Joe Burrow – 27/39, 200 yards, 4 TD, INT
- TB – Tom Brady – 30/44, 312 yards, 3 TD, 2 INT

**Top rushers**

- CIN – Samaje Perine – 7 rushes, 24 yards
- TB – Leonard Fournette – 10 rushes, 44 yards

**Top receivers**

- CIN – Ja'Marr Chase – 7 receptions, 60 yards, TD
- TB – Chris Godwin – 8 receptions, 83 yards, TD

With the win the Bengals have beaten all NFC South teams in 2022. This win also gave the Bengals first place in the division as the Baltimore Ravens lost to the Cleveland Browns the previous day.

==== Week 16: at New England Patriots ====
Week 16: Cincinnati Bengals at New England Patriots – Game summary

Quarter	1	2	3	4	Total
**Bengals**	12	10	0	0	**22**
Patriots	0	0	6	12	**18**

at Gillette Stadium, Foxborough, Massachusetts

- Date: December 24
- Game time: 1:00 p.m. EST
- Game weather: Sunny, 17 °F (−8 °C)
- Game attendance: 65,878
- Referee: Craig Wrolstad
- TV announcers (CBS): Ian Eagle, Charles Davis and Evan Washburn
- Recap, Game Book

Game information

**First quarter**

- CIN – Tee Higgins 9-yard pass from Joe Burrow (kick failed), 12:24. Bengals 6–0. **Drive: 5 plays, 78 yards, 2:36.**
- CIN – Trenton Irwin 23-yard pass from Joe Burrow (run failed), 5:16. Bengals 12–0. **Drive: 9 plays, 59 yards, 5:19.**

**Second quarter**

- CIN – Evan McPherson 28-yard field goal, 14:51. Bengals 15–0. **Drive: 10 plays, 41 yards, 3:58.**
- CIN – Trenton Irwin 4-yard pass from Joe Burrow (Evan McPherson kick), 0:14. Bengals 22–0. **Drive: 12 plays, 80 yards, 2:02.**

**Third quarter**

- NE – Marcus Jones 69-yard interception return (kick failed), 3:51. Bengals 22–6.

**Fourth quarter**

- NE – Kendrick Bourne 5-yard pass from Mac Jones (pass failed), 12:58. Bengals 22–12. **Drive: 11 plays, 77 yards, 4:53.**
- NE – Jakobi Meyers 48-yard pass from Mac Jones (kick failed), 6:02. Bengals 22–18. **Drive: 7 plays, 67 yards, 3:04.**

**Top passers**

- CIN – Joe Burrow – 40/52, 375 yards, 3 TD, 2 INT
- NE – Mac Jones – 21/33, 240 yards, 2 TD

**Top rushers**

- CIN – Joe Mixon – 16 rushes, 65 yards
- NE – Rhamondre Stevenson – 13 rushes, 30 yards

**Top receivers**

- CIN – Tee Higgins – 8 receptions, 128 yards, TD
- NE – Kendrick Bourne – 6 receptions, 100 yards, TD

With their seventh straight win, the Bengals improved to 11–4. It became their first 7-game winning streak since 2015. In addition, the Bengals defeated the Patriots for the first time since 2013, and for the first time on the road since 1986. It was also their first victory against the Patriots after the Brady–Belichick era.

==== Week 17: vs. Buffalo Bills ====
Week 17: Buffalo Bills at Cincinnati Bengals – Game summary

Quarter	1	2	3	4	Total
Bills	3	-	-	-	**3**
Bengals	7	-	-	-	**7**

at Paycor Stadium, Cincinnati, Ohio

- Date: January 2
- Game time: 8:30 p.m. EST
- Referee: Shawn Smith
- TV announcers (ESPN/ABC): Joe Buck, Troy Aikman and Lisa Salters
- Preview

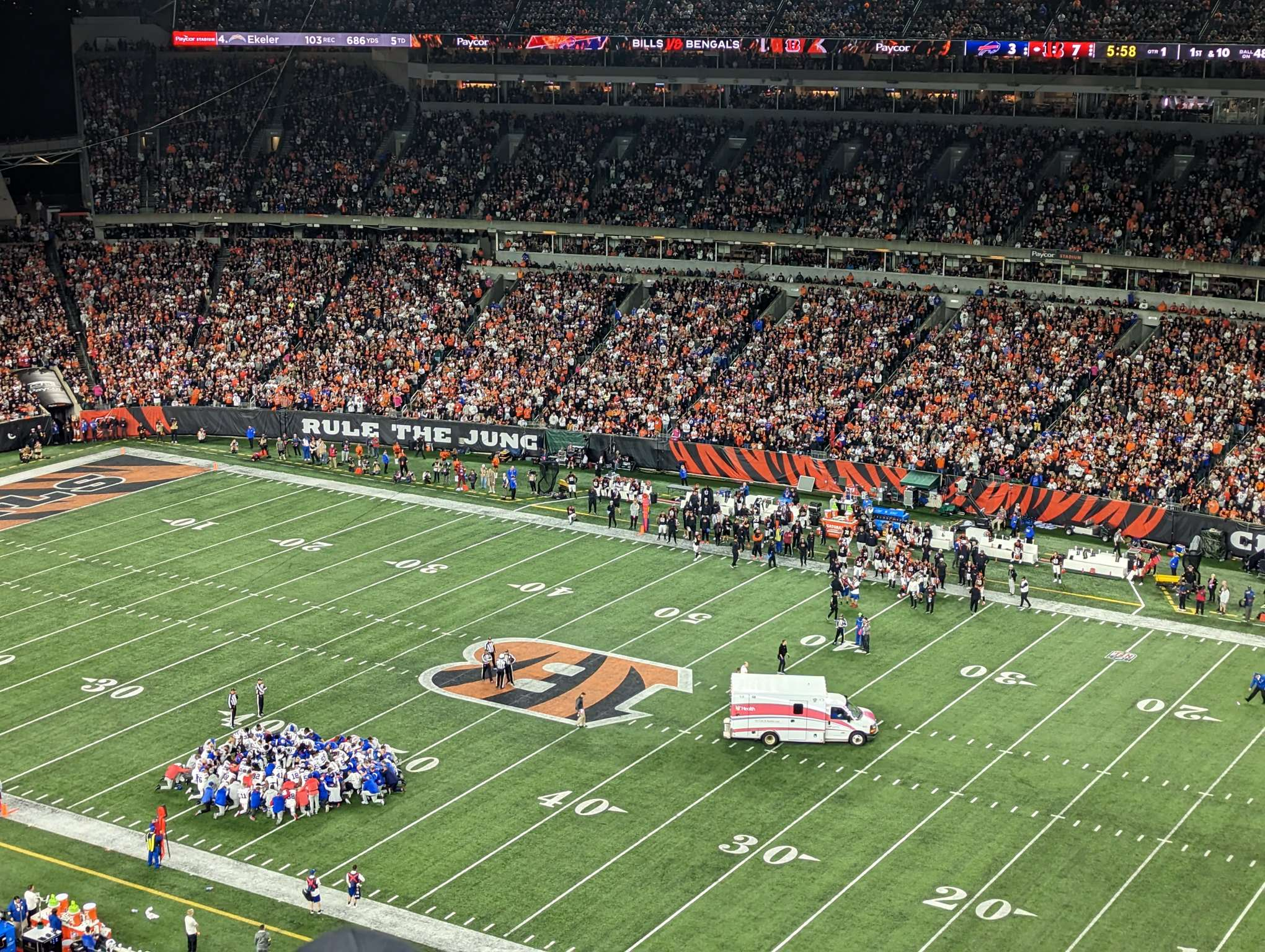
Bills players kneel (bottom left) as an ambulance takes Damar Hamlin off the field.

The game was suspended with 5:58 remaining in the first quarter after an injury to Damar Hamlin, who was sent to the hospital in critical condition after suffering cardiac arrest and collapsing on the field. The NFL released a statement that said that the game would not be resumed during the week, and that both teams' Week 18 game would be played as scheduled. On January 5, the NFL announced the game would not be resumed and would be ruled a no-contest. It was the only time in NFL history that a regular season game has been canceled after starting and was never made up. Due to the cancellation, the Bengals stayed at 11–4.

==== Week 18: vs. Baltimore Ravens ====
Week 18: Baltimore Ravens at Cincinnati Bengals – Game summary

Quarter	1	2	3	4	Total
Ravens	0	7	6	3	**16**
**Bengals**	10	14	3	0	**27**

at Paycor Stadium, Cincinnati, Ohio

- Date: January 8
- Game time: 1:00 p.m. EST
- Game weather: Cloudy, 40 °F (4 °C)
- Game attendance: 65,849
- Referee: Ronald Torbert
- TV announcers (CBS): Kevin Harlan, Trent Green and Melanie Collins
- Recap, Game Book

Game information

**First quarter**

- CIN – Evan McPherson 34-yard field goal, 5:01. Bengals 3–0. **Drive: 17 plays, 63 yards, 7:49.**
- CIN – Joe Mixon 1-yard run (Evan McPherson kick), 1:11. Bengals 10–0. **Drive: 8 plays, 48 yards, 3:48.**

**Second quarter**

- CIN – Ja'Marr Chase 26-yard pass from Joe Burrow (Evan McPherson kick), 14:12. Bengals 17–0. **Drive: 3 plays, 32 yards, 0:43.**
- BAL – Kenyan Drake 4-yard run (Justin Tucker kick), 1:57. Bengals 17–7. **Drive: 10 plays, 76 yards, 4:08.**
- CIN – Joseph Ossai fumble recovery in the end zone (Evan McPherson kick), 0:30. Bengals 24–7.

**Third quarter**

- BAL – Justin Tucker 26-yard field goal, 10:34. Bengals 24–10. **Drive: 4 plays, 1 yards, 0:52.**
- CIN – Evan McPherson 26-yard field goal, 6:27. Bengals 27–10. **Drive: 8 plays, 67 yards, 4:07.**
- BAL – Justin Tucker 51-yard field goal, 1:59. Bengals 27–13. **Drive: 11 plays, 42 yards, 4:28.**

**Fourth quarter**

- BAL – Justin Tucker 27-yard field goal, 12:17. Bengals 27–16. **Drive: 9 plays, 73 yards, 3:40.**

**Top passers**

- BAL – Anthony Brown – 19/44, 286 yards, 2 INT
- CIN – Joe Burrow – 25/42, 215 yards, TD

**Top rushers**

- BAL – Kenyan Drake – 16 rushes, 60 yards, TD
- CIN – Joe Mixon – 11 rushes, 27 yards, TD

**Top receivers**

- BAL – Isaiah Likely – 8 receptions, 103 yards
- CIN – Ja'Marr Chase – 8 receptions, 86 yards, TD

With the win, the Bengals finished the regular season at 12–4, and avoided being swept by any AFC North rivals for the first time since 2015. The win also gave the Bengals home-field advantage for the Wild Card round of the playoffs.

=== Standings ===
==== Division ====
AFC North
	W	L	T	PCT	DIV	CONF	PF	PA	STK
^{(3)} Cincinnati Bengals	12	4	0	.750	3–3	8–3	418	322	W8
^{(6)} Baltimore Ravens	10	7	0	.588	3–3	6–6	350	315	L2
Pittsburgh Steelers	9	8	0	.529	3–3	5–7	308	346	W4
Cleveland Browns	7	10	0	.412	3–3	4–8	361	381	L1

==== Conference ====
AFC
#	Team	Division	W	L	T	PCT	DIV	CONF	SOS	SOV	STK
**Division leaders**
1	Kansas City Chiefs	West	14	3	0	.824	6–0	9–3	.453	.422	W5
2	Buffalo Bills	East	13	3	0	.813	4–2	9–2	.489	.471	W7
3	Cincinnati Bengals	North	12	4	0	.750	3–3	8–3	.507	.490	W8
4	Jacksonville Jaguars	South	9	8	0	.529	4–2	8–4	.467	.438	W5
**Wild cards**
5 (Note: LA Chargers claimed the No. 5 seed over Baltimore based on conference record (7–5 vs. 6–6).)	Los Angeles Chargers	West	10	7	0	.588	2–4	7–5	.443	.341	L1
6	Baltimore Ravens	North	10	7	0	.588	3–3	6–6	.509	.456	L2
7 (Note: Miami finished ahead of Pittsburgh based on head-to-head victory, claiming the 7th and final playoff spot.)	Miami Dolphins	East	9	8	0	.529	3–3	7–5	.537	.457	W1
**Did not qualify for the postseason**
8	Pittsburgh Steelers	North	9	8	0	.529	3–3	5–7	.519	.451	W4
9	New England Patriots	East	8	9	0	.471	3–3	6–6	.502	.415	L1
10 (Note: NY Jets and Tennessee finished ahead of Cleveland based on conference record (5–7 vs. 4–8).) (Note: NY Jets finished ahead of Tennessee based on common record (3–3 vs. 2–4 against: Buffalo, Cincinnati, Denver, Green Bay, Jacksonville).)	New York Jets	East	7	10	0	.412	2–4	5–7	.538	.458	L6
11	Tennessee Titans	South	7	10	0	.412	3–3	5–7	.509	.336	L7
12	Cleveland Browns	North	7	10	0	.412	3–3	4–8	.524	.492	L1
13	Las Vegas Raiders	West	6	11	0	.353	3–3	5–7	.474	.397	L3
14	Denver Broncos	West	5	12	0	.294	1–5	3–9	.481	.465	W1
15	Indianapolis Colts	South	4	12	1	.265	1–4–1	4–7–1	.512	.500	L7
16	Houston Texans	South	3	13	1	.206	3–2–1	3–8–1	.481	.402	W1
**Tiebreakers** (Note: When breaking ties for three or more teams under the NFL's rules, they are first broken within divisions, then comparing only the highest ranked remaining team from each division.)

== Postseason ==
=== Schedule ===
Round	Date	Opponent (seed)	Result	Record	Venue	Recap
Wild Card	January 15	Baltimore Ravens (6)	W 24–17	1–0	Paycor Stadium	Recap
Divisional	January 22	at Buffalo Bills (2)	W 27–10	2–0	Highmark Stadium	Recap
AFC Championship	January 29	at Kansas City Chiefs (1)	L 20–23	2–1	Arrowhead Stadium	Recap

=== Game summaries ===
==== AFC Wild Card Playoffs: vs. (6) Baltimore Ravens ====
AFC Wild Card Playoffs: (6) Baltimore Ravens at (3) Cincinnati Bengals – Game summary

Quarter	1	2	3	4	Total
Ravens	0	10	7	0	17
Bengals	3	6	8	7	24

at Paycor Stadium, Cincinnati, Ohio

- Date: January 15, 2023
- Game time: 8:15 p.m. EST
- Game weather: Mostly clear, 35 °F (2 °C)
- Game attendance: 66,399
- Referee: Clay Martin
- TV announcers (NBC): Mike Tirico, Cris Collinsworth, and Melissa Stark
- Recap, Game Book

Game information

First quarter

- CIN – Evan McPherson 39-yard field goal, 8:22. Bengals 3–0. Drive: 14 plays, 54 yards, 6:38.

Second quarter

- CIN – Ja'Marr Chase 7-yard pass from Joe Burrow (Evan McPherson kick wide right), 14:56. Bengals 9–0. Drive: 10 plays, 60 yards, 6:07.
- BAL – J. K. Dobbins 2-yard pass from Tyler Huntley (Justin Tucker kick), 4:53. Bengals 9–7. Drive: 17 plays, 75 yards, 10:03.
- BAL – Justin Tucker 22-yard field goal, 0:07. Ravens 10–9. Drive: 9 plays, 40 yards, 2:31.

Third quarter

- CIN – Joe Burrow 1-yard rush from (Joe Burrow-Tee Higgins pass), 5:02. Bengals 17–10. Drive: 12 plays, 83 yards, 7:08.
- BAL – Demarcus Robinson 41-yard pass from Tyler Huntley (Justin Tucker kick), 2:13. Tied 17–17. Drive: 5 plays, 81 yards, 2:49.

Fourth quarter

- CIN – Sam Hubbard 98-yard fumble return (Evan McPherson kick), 11:39. Bengals 24–17. Drive: 9 plays, 80 yards, 4:15.

Top passers

- BAL – Tyler Huntley – 17/29, 226 yards, 2 TD, 1 INT
- CIN – Joe Burrow – 23/32, 209 yards, 1 TD

Top rushers

- BAL – J. K. Dobbins – 13 rushes, 62 yards
- CIN – Joe Mixon – 11 rushes, 39 yards

Top receivers

- BAL – Mark Andrews – 5 receptions, 73 yards
- CIN – Ja'Marr Chase – 9 receptions, 84 yards, 1 TD

The game started with a drive that ended with an Evan McPherson field goal making the game 3–0. However, Tyler Huntley threw an interception to Akeem Davis-Gaither which resulted into another Bengals drive that ended with a score, this time a touchdown to Ja'Marr Chase from Joe Burrow. The extra point was missed, making the game 9–0. The Ravens bounced back from the early deficit however, with a touchdown to J. K. Dobbins that caused the score to become 9–7. Before Halftime, the Ravens got into the redzone, but were stopped short of the goal line, which forced them to settle for a field goal, making the score 9–10. After getting the ball back at halftime, the Ravens drive stalled, which eventually ended up into a Bengals touchdown from Joe Burrow rushing into the endzone. The Bengals went for two and scored with Tee Higgins after the touchdown, making the score 17–10. The Ravens responded with a burnt coverage play that resulted into a 41-yard touchdown by Demarcus Robinson, making the game 17-17. After a stalled drive by the Bengals, the Ravens got the ball back. Tyler Huntley ran for a 35-yard gain all the way to the Bengals two-yard line, with Jessie Bates making the touchdown saving tackle. Facing third and goal, Tyler Huntley attempted a diving quarterback sneak, but fumbled before he got over the endzone. Sam Hubbard caught the fumble and returned it 98 yards to the Bengals end zone, forcing the score to 24–17. After exchanging stalled drives, the Ravens made on final attempt to force the game to overtime. Facing a 4th and 20 with only 8 seconds left at the Cincinnati 27, Tyler Huntley threw a deep pass to the end zone. The pass was originally deflected, but James Proche failed to catch the falling ball, forcing a turnover on downs and winning the game for the Bengals.

==== AFC Divisional Playoffs: at (2) Buffalo Bills ====
AFC Divisional Playoffs: (3) Cincinnati Bengals at (2) Buffalo Bills – Game summary

Quarter	1	2	3	4	Total
Bengals	14	3	7	3	27
Bills	0	7	3	0	10

at Highmark Stadium, Orchard Park, New York

- Date: January 22, 2023
- Game time: 3:05 p.m. EST
- Game weather: Snow, 34 °F (1 °C)
- Game attendance: 70,733
- Referee: Carl Cheffers
- TV announcers (CBS): Jim Nantz, Tony Romo, Tracy Wolfson, and Jay Feely
- Recap, Game Book

Game information

First quarter

- CIN – Ja'Marr Chase 28-yard pass from Joe Burrow (Evan McPherson kick), 11:40. Bengals 7–0. Drive: 6 plays, 79 yards, 3:20.
- CIN – Hayden Hurst 15-yard pass from Joe Burrow (Evan McPherson kick), 3:47. Bengals 14–0. Drive: 10 plays, 72 yards, 6:15.

Second quarter

- BUF – Josh Allen 1-yard rush (Tyler Bass kick), 7:25. Bengals 14–7. Drive: 15 plays, 75 yards, 7:41.
- CIN – Evan McPherson 28-yard field goal, 1:49. Bengals 17–7. Drive: 14 plays, 65 yards, 5:36.

Third quarter

- BUF – Tyler Bass 25-yard field goal, 7:42. Bengals 17–10. Drive: 14 plays, 65 yards, 7:18.
- CIN – Joe Mixon 1-yard rush (Evan McPherson kick), 1:18. Bengals 24–10. Drive: 12 plays, 75 yards, 6:25.

Fourth quarter

- CIN – Evan McPherson 20-yard field goal, 11:22. Bengals 27–10. Drive: 9 plays, 61 yards, 3:40.

Top passers

- CIN – Joe Burrow – 23/36, 242 yards, 2 TD
- BUF – Josh Allen – 25/42, 264 yards, INT

Top rushers

- CIN – Joe Mixon – 20 rushes, 105 yards, 1 TD
- BUF – Josh Allen – 8 rushes, 26 yards, TD

Top receivers

- CIN – Ja'Marr Chase – 5 receptions, 61 yards, 1 TD
- BUF – Dawson Knox – 5 receptions, 65 yards

==== AFC Championship: at (1) Kansas City Chiefs ====
AFC Championship: (3) Cincinnati Bengals at (1) Kansas City Chiefs – Game summary

Quarter	1	2	3	4	Total
Bengals	0	6	7	7	20
Chiefs	3	10	7	3	23

at Arrowhead Stadium, Kansas City, Missouri

- Date: January 29, 2023
- Game time: 6:40 p.m. EST/5:40 p.m. CST
- Game weather: Cloudy, 22 °F (−6 °C)
- Game attendance: 73,426
- Referee: Ronald Torbert
- TV announcers (CBS): Jim Nantz, Tony Romo, Tracy Wolfson, and Jay Feely
- Recap, Game Book

Game information

First quarter

- KC – Harrison Butker 43-yard field goal, 8:50. Chiefs 3–0. Drive: 7 plays, 39 yards, 3:21.

Second quarter

- KC – Harrison Butker 24-yard field goal, 8:59. Chiefs 6–0. Drive: 12 plays, 61 yards, 6:18.
- CIN – Evan McPherson 30-yard field goal, 6:22. Chiefs 6–3. Drive: 13 plays, 63 yards, 6:22.
- KC – Travis Kelce 14-yard pass from Patrick Mahomes (Harrison Butker kick), 3:53. Chiefs 13–3. Drive: 8 plays, 75 yards, 4:43.
- CIN – Evan McPherson 23-yard field goal, 0:00. Chiefs 13–6. Drive: 12 plays, 90 yards, 2:03.

Third quarter

- CIN – Tee Higgins 27-yard pass from Joe Burrow (Evan McPherson kick), 9:54. Tied 13–13. Drive: 8 plays, 62 yards, 3:35.
- KC – Marquez Valdes-Scantling 19-yard pass from Patrick Mahomes (Harrison Butker kick), 4:15. Chiefs 20–13. Drive: 11 plays, 77 yards, 5:39.

Fourth quarter

- CIN – Samaje Perine 2-yard rush (Evan McPherson kick), 13:30. Tied 20–20. Drive: 6 plays, 45 yards, 2:25.
- KC – Harrison Butker 45-yard field goal, 0:03. Chiefs 23–20. Drive: 4 plays, 26 yards, 0:27.

Top passers

- CIN – Joe Burrow – 26/41, 270 yards, TD, 2 INT
- KC – Patrick Mahomes – 29/43, 326 yards, 2 TD

Top rushers

- CIN – Joe Burrow – 4 rushes, 30 yards
- KC – Isiah Pacheco – 10 rushes, 26 yards

Top receivers

- CIN – Tee Higgins – 6 receptions, 83 yards, TD
- KC – Marquez Valdes-Scantling – 6 receptions, 116 yards, TD
