= Trenton Irwin =

American football player (born 1995)

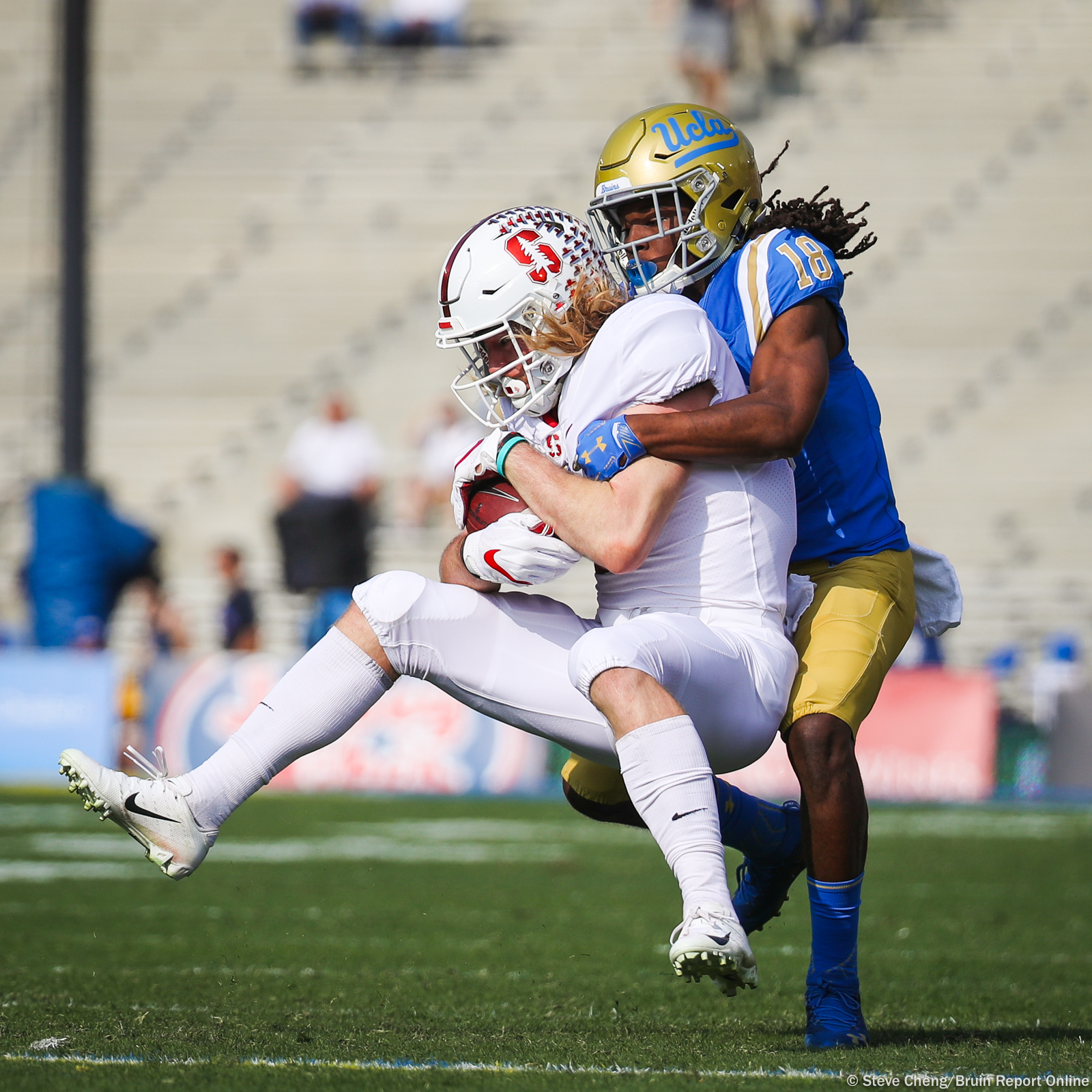
- Irwin with the Stanford Cardinal in 2018

Profile
- Position: Wide receiver

Personal information
- Born: December 10, 1995 (age 30); Glendale, California, U.S.
- Listed height: 6 ft 1 in (1.85 m)
- Listed weight: 200 lb (91 kg)

Career information
- High school: William S. Hart (Santa Clarita, California)
- College: Stanford (2015–2018)
- NFL draft: 2019: undrafted

Career history
- Miami Dolphins (2019)*; Cincinnati Bengals (2019–2024); Carolina Panthers (2024)*; Jacksonville Jaguars (2025)*; New York Jets (2025)*; San Francisco 49ers (2026)*
- * Offseason or practice squad member only

Career NFL statistics as of 2024
- Receptions: 46
- Receiving yards: 601
- Receiving touchdowns: 5
- Stats at Pro Football Reference

Trenton Irwin (born December 10, 1995) is an American professional football wide receiver. He played college football at Stanford before signing with the Miami Dolphins in 2019 as an undrafted free agent.

== Early life ==
Irwin attended Rosemont Middle School, and afterward Irwin attended and played high school football at William S. Hart High School in Newhall, California.

== College career ==
Irwin played college football at Stanford. He finished his college career with 152 receptions for 1,738 receiving yards and five touchdowns, while also returning 20 punts for 230 yards. He also had at least one reception in 40 consecutive games. Irwin was named Honorable Mention All-Pac-12 in each of his final three seasons at Stanford.

== Professional career ==
Pre-draft measurables
Height	Weight	Arm length	Hand span
6 ft 1 1/2 in (1.87 m)	204 lb (93 kg)	31 1/8 in (0.79 m)	8 7/8 in (0.23 m)
All values from Pro Day

=== Miami Dolphins ===
Irwin went undrafted in the 2019 NFL draft, and signed with the Miami Dolphins on May 10, 2019. He was released from the Dolphins on August 31.

=== Cincinnati Bengals ===
==== 2019 ====
Irwin was signed to the practice squad of the Cincinnati Bengals on October 3, 2019. He was promoted to the team's active roster on December 27.

==== 2020 ====
On September 5, 2020, Irwin was waived by the Bengals and signed to the practice squad the next day.

In Week 16 against the Houston Texans, Irwin was elevated to the active roster, and made the first reception of his career, a 5-yard pass from quarterback Brandon Allen. He reverted to the practice squad after the game.

==== 2021 ====
On September 1, 2021, Irwin was waived by the Bengals and re-signed to the practice squad. He was elevated to the active roster on September 15.

In Week 4, Irwin caught his only reception of 2021 for a 25-yard gain against the Jacksonville Jaguars.

==== 2022 ====
On March 21, 2022, Irwin re-signed with the Bengals. He was waived on August 30, and signed to the practice squad the next day.

In Week 11, against the Pittsburgh Steelers, Irwin caught his first professional touchdown from quarterback Joe Burrow on a goal-line pass. On November 22, Irwin was signed to the active roster. Irwin caught his second career touchdown pass in Week 14 against the Cleveland Browns, when the Bengals called a Flea flicker that left him open in the backfield for a 35-yard touchdown.

Irwin played his most impressive professional outing to date in Week 16 against the New England Patriots. Out of four targets, he netted three receptions for 45 yards and two touchdowns, narrowly missing a pass in the end zone that could have resulted in a third touchdown, which would have given him a perfect reception percentage in the 22–18 victory. Irwin played in nine games in the 2022 regular season. He finished with 15 receptions for 231 receiving yards and four receiving touchdowns.

==== 2023 ====
Irwin made his first catch of the season in Week 4 against the Tennessee Titans, pulling in one reception for 17 yards. The following week against the Arizona Cardinals, Irwin was named a starting wide receiver due to Tee Higgins being ruled inactive for a rib injury. He took advantage of this opportunity by pulling in 8 catches for 60 yards. Irwin scored his only touchdown of the season in Week 10 against the Houston Texans. In addition to his lone touchdown, he finished the season with 25 receptions for 316 yards, both career highs.

==== 2024 ====
Irwin re-signed with the Bengals on March 19, 2024. He competed with Andrei Iosivas, Charlie Jones, and Jermaine Burton for the Bengals' third starting wide receiver position in the preseason, with Iosivas ultimately winning the job, and Irwin being named the fourth wide receiver on the depth chart to begin the year. On December 2, the Bengals waived Irwin for the fourth time in his five seasons with the franchise.

=== Carolina Panthers ===
On December 10, 2024, Irwin was signed to the Carolina Panthers' practice squad.

=== Jacksonville Jaguars ===
On June 3, 2025, the Jacksonville Jaguars signed Irwin. He was released on August 26 as part of final roster cuts.

=== New York Jets ===
On October 14, 2025, Irwin signed with the New York Jets' practice squad.

=== San Francisco 49ers ===
On July 31, 2026, Irwin signed a one-year contract with the San Francisco 49ers. On August 30, he was released by San Francisco as a part of final roster cuts.

== Career statistics ==
=== NFL ===
Legend
**Bold**	Career high

Regular season
Year	Team	Games		Receiving						Rushing					Kick returns					Punt returns					Fumbles	
Year	Team	GP	GS	Tgt	Rec	Yds	Avg	Lng	TD	Att	Yds	Avg	Lng	TD	Ret	Yds	Avg	Lng	TD	Ret	Yds	Avg	Lng	TD	Fum	Lost
2019	CIN	1	0	0	0	0	0.0	0	0	0	0	0.0	0	0	–	–	–	–	–	–	–	–	–	–	0	0
2020	CIN	1	0	2	1	5	5.0	5	0	0	0	0.0	0	0	–	–	–	–	–	–	–	–	–	–	0	0
2021	CIN	7	0	5	2	34	**17.0**	25	0	0	0	0.0	0	0	–	–	–	–	–	3	31	**10.3**	15	0	0	0
2022	CIN	9	2	23	15	231	15.4	**45T**	**4**	**1**	**11**	**11.0**	**11**	0	–	–	–	–	–	–	–	–	–	–	0	0
2023	CIN	**16**	**5**	**32**	**25**	**316**	12.6	32	1	0	0	0.0	0	0	1	8	8.0	8	0	**10**	**98**	9.8	**28**	0	0	0
2024	CIN	7	2	10	3	15	5.0	6	0	0	0	0.0	0	0	–	–	–	–	–	8	56	7.0	17	0	0	0
Career		41	9	72	46	601	13.1	45T	5	1	11	11.0	11	0	1	8	8.0	8	0	21	185	8.8	28	0	0	0

Postseason
Year	Team	Games		Receiving					Rushing					Fumbles	
Year	Team	GP	GS	Rec	Yds	Avg	Lng	TD	Att	Yds	Avg	Lng	TD	Fum	Lost
2022	CIN	3	3	3	27	9	13	0	0	0	0	0	0	0	0
Career		3	3	2	19	9	13	0	0	0	0	0	0	0	0

=== College ===
Stanford
Year	G	Rec	Yds	Avg	TD
2015	9	12	150	12.5	0
2016	13	37	442	11.9	1
2017	14	43	461	10.7	2
2018	12	60	685	11.4	2
**Career**	**48**	**152**	**1,738**	**11.4**	**5**
