= Daxton Hill =

American football player (born 2000)

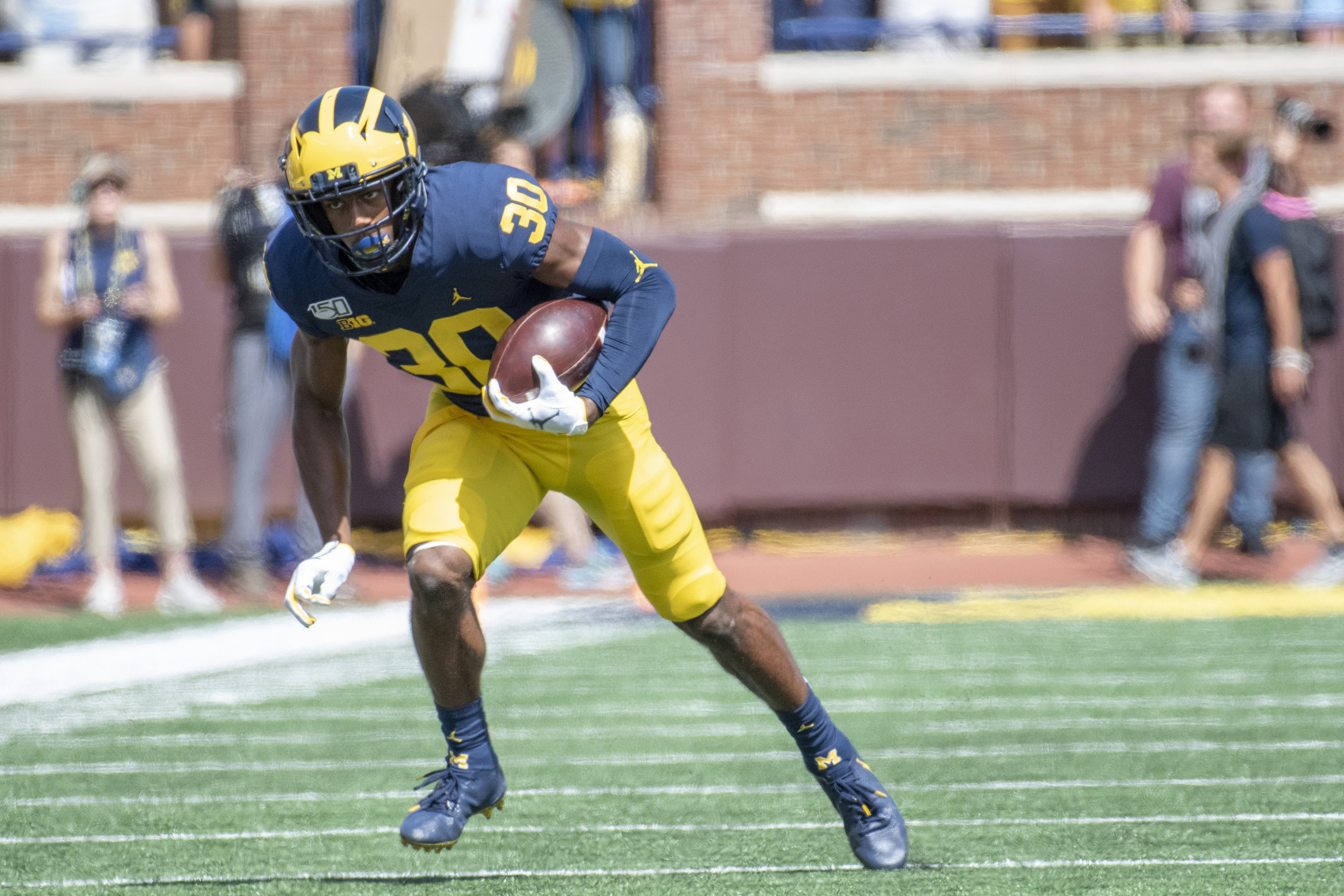
- Hill playing for the Michigan Wolverines in 2019

No. 23 – Cincinnati Bengals
- Position: Cornerback
- Roster status: Active

Personal information
- Born: September 29, 2000 (age 26); Tulsa, Oklahoma, U.S.
- Listed height: 6 ft 0 in (1.83 m)
- Listed weight: 195 lb (88 kg)

Career information
- High school: Booker T. Washington (Tulsa)
- College: Michigan (2019–2021)
- NFL draft: 2022: 1st round, 31st overall pick

Career history
- Cincinnati Bengals (2022–present)

Awards and highlights
- First-team All-Big Ten (2021)

Career NFL statistics as of Week 7, 2026
- Total tackles: 270
- Sacks: 2.5
- Forced fumbles: 1
- Pass deflections: 29
- Interceptions: 3
- Stats at Pro Football Reference

Daxton Jor-El Hill (born September 29, 2000) is an American professional football cornerback for the Cincinnati Bengals of the National Football League (NFL). He played college football for the Michigan Wolverines, where he was named an All-Big Ten selection. He was selected by the Bengals in the first round of the 2022 NFL draft.

== Early life ==
Hill attended Booker T. Washington High School in Tulsa, Oklahoma. As a senior in 2019, he was the Gatorade Football Player of the Year for Oklahoma. He played in the 2019 U.S. Army All-American Game. A five star recruit, he committed to play college football at the University of Michigan before switching to the University of Alabama and then back to Michigan.

== College career ==
As a true freshman at Michigan in 2019, Hill played in 13 games with three starts and had 36 tackles and one interception. As a sophomore in 2020, he started six games, recording 46 tackles and one interception. He returned to Michigan as a starter in 2021 and received first-team all conference honors. Hill declared for the 2022 NFL draft following the 2021 season.

== Professional career ==
Pre-draft measurables
Height	Weight	Arm length	Hand span	Wingspan	40-yard dash	10-yard split	20-yard split	20-yard shuttle	Three-cone drill	Vertical jump	Broad jump
6 ft 0 1/4 in (1.84 m)	191 lb (87 kg)	32 1/4 in (0.82 m)	9 1/2 in (0.24 m)	6 ft 7 1/4 in (2.01 m)	4.38 s	1.47 s	2.54 s	4.06 s	6.57 s	37.0 in (0.94 m)	10 ft 2 in (3.10 m)
All values from NFL Combine/Pro Day

=== 2022 season ===
The Cincinnati Bengals selected Hill in the first round (31st overall) of the 2022 NFL draft. He was the second safety drafted in 2022 behind Kyle Hamilton (14th overall).

On May 18, 2022, the Cincinnati Bengals signed Hill to a four—year, $11.66 million contract that includes a signing bonus of $5.66 million and is fully guaranteed at signing.

Entering training camp, defensive coordinator Lou Anarumo opted to ease Hill into his rookie year by backing up Jessie Bates at free safety, and playing as a gunner on special teams snaps alongside Stanley Morgan. Head coach Zac Taylor named Hill the primary backup safety to begin the regular season, behind starting tandem Jessie Bates and Vonn Bell.

On September 11, 2022, Hill made his professional regular season debut during a 20-23 overtime loss in their home-opener against the Pittsburgh Steelers. In Week 3, he earned his first career as a nickelback during a 27-12 victory at the New York Jets. Hill sustained a shoulder injury and was subsequently inactive as the Bengals lost 37-30 at the Steelers in Week 11. In Week 15, he set a season-high with eight combined tackles (five solo) during a 34-23 victory at the Tampa Bay Buccaneers.

=== 2023 season ===
In his second season, Hill was named as the starting free safety. During the Bengals' week 1 loss against the Cleveland Browns, Hill recorded his first career interception off of quarterback Deshaun Watson. Hill had a career high in tackles in week 2 against the Baltimore Ravens, making 12 total tackles, nine of which were solo.

Hill's first career sack came during the week 3 game against the Los Angeles Rams, and he was credited with another half-sack in week 5 against the Arizona Cardinals.

=== 2024 season ===
Entering his third season, it was announced that Hill would be converting into a cornerback. Following preseason, it was announced that Hill had beat out DJ Turner for the starting cornerback role. He suffered a torn ACL in week 5 and was placed on season-ending injured reserve on October 8, 2024.

=== 2025 season ===
On April 30, 2025, the Bengals exercised the fifth-year option on Hill's contract. Hill will receive $12,682,000 for the 2026 season.

== Personal life ==
Hill's middle name Jor-El was taken from the comic book character of the same name. His brother, Justice Hill, played running back for the Oklahoma State Cowboys and was drafted by the Ravens in the fourth round of the 2019 NFL draft.

== NFL career statistics ==
Legend
**Bold**	Career high

=== Regular season ===
Year	Team	Games		Tackles					Interceptions						Fumbles			
Year	Team	GP	GS	Cmb	Solo	Ast	Sck	TFL	PD	Int	Yds	Avg	Lng	TD	FF	FR	Yds	TD
2022	CIN	15	2	16	11	5	0.0	0	0	0	0	0.0	0	0	0	0	0	0
2023	CIN	17	17	**110**	**72**	**38**	**1.5**	**6**	**11**	**2**	**20**	**10.0**	**20**	0	0	0	0	0
2024	CIN	5	5	25	20	5	1.0	1	2	0	0	0.0	0	0	0	0	0	0
2025	CIN	17	17	88	57	31	0.0	2	**11**	1	0	0.0	0	0	0	0	0	0
Career		54	41	239	160	79	2.5	9	24	3	20	6.7	20	0	0	0	0	0

=== Playoffs ===
Year	Team	Games		Tackles					Interceptions						Fumbles			
Year	Team	GP	GS	Cmb	Solo	Ast	Sck	TFL	PD	Int	Yds	Avg	Lng	TD	FF	FR	Yds	TD
2022	CIN	3	0	2	1	1	0.0	0	0	0	0	0.0	0	0	0	0	0	0
Career		3	0	2	1	1	0.0	0	0	0	0	0.0	0	0	0	0	0	0
