= Sam Hubbard =

American football player (born 1995)

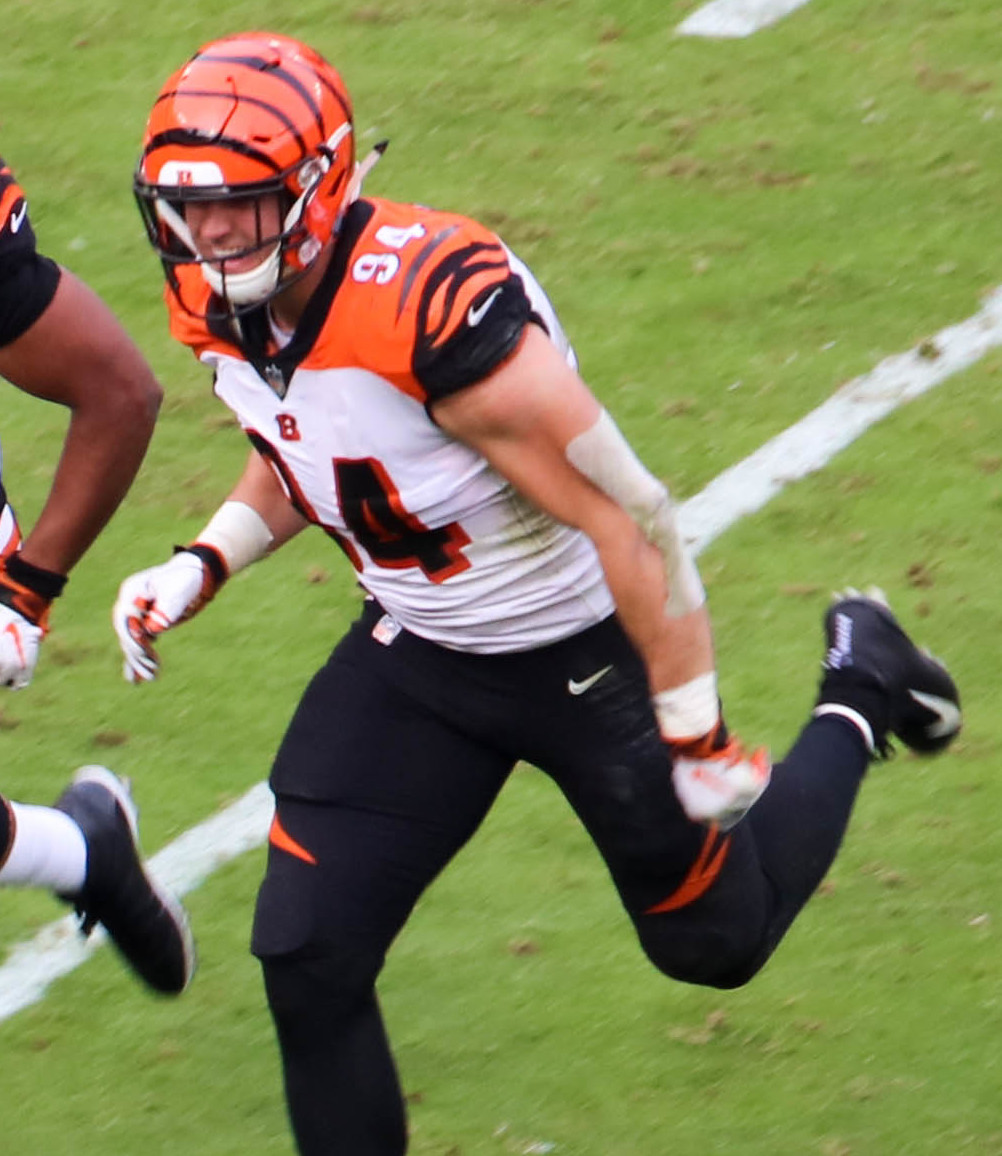
- Hubbard with the Cincinnati Bengals in 2018

No. 94
- Position: Defensive end

Personal information
- Born: June 29, 1995 (age 31); Cincinnati, Ohio, U.S.
- Listed height: 6 ft 5 in (1.96 m)
- Listed weight: 265 lb (120 kg)

Career information
- High school: Archbishop Moeller (Cincinnati)
- College: Ohio State (2014–2017)
- NFL draft: 2018: 3rd round, 77th overall pick

Career history
- Cincinnati Bengals (2018–2024)

Awards and highlights
- Second-team All-Big Ten (2017)

Career NFL statistics
- Tackles: 398
- Sacks: 38.5
- Forced fumbles: 6
- Fumble recoveries: 5
- Pass deflections: 16
- Interceptions: 1
- Touchdowns: 2
- Stats at Pro Football Reference

Sam Hubbard (born June 29, 1995) is an American former professional football player who was a defensive end for his entire seven-year career with the Cincinnati Bengals of the National Football League (NFL). He played college football for the Ohio State Buckeyes and was selected by the Bengals in the third round of the 2018 NFL draft.

== Early life ==
Hubbard attended Archbishop Moeller High School in Cincinnati, Ohio. Hubbard played the position of Safety in high school, and as a senior, had 109 tackles and five interceptions. He was rated as a five-star recruit by Scout.com and committed to Ohio State University to play college football. Hubbard also played lacrosse in high school, and was at one time committed to the University of Notre Dame to play college lacrosse.

== College career ==
Hubbard redshirted his first year at Ohio State in 2014. He was a part of the roster that won the National Championship for the 2014 season. As a redshirt freshman in 2015, he played in all 13 games and had 28 tackles and 6.5 sacks. As a redshirt sophomore in 2016, he started all 13 games and had 46 tackles and 3.5 sacks. Hubbard played in 14 games in 2017 as a redshirt junior and had 42 tackles along with a career high seven sacks. Hubbard declared for the 2018 NFL draft on December 30, 2017.

== Professional career ==
=== Pre-draft ===
On December 30, 2017, Hubbard released a statement on Twitter announcing his decision to enter the 2018 NFL draft. He attended the NFL Scouting Combine in Indianapolis and completed the majority of combine drills, but opted to skip the 40-yard dash and bench press. Hubbard participated in linebacker and defensive end drills at the combine. On March 22, 2018, he participated at Ohio State's pro day and performed positional drills, the 40-yard dash, 20-yard dash, and 10-yard dash. At the conclusion of the pre-draft process, Hubbard was projected to be a first or second round pick by NFL draft experts and scouts. He was ranked the third best defensive end in the draft by DraftScout.com, was ranked the fourth best defensive end by Scouts Inc., and was also ranked the fifth best edge rusher in the draft by Sports Illustrated.

External videos
- Sam Hubbard's NFL Combine Workout

Pre-draft measurables
Height	Weight	Arm length	Hand span	Wingspan	40-yard dash	10-yard split	20-yard split	20-yard shuttle	Three-cone drill	Vertical jump	Broad jump	Bench press
6 ft 5 3/8 in (1.97 m)	270 lb (122 kg)	33 1/8 in (0.84 m)	10 in (0.25 m)	6 ft 6 1/4 in (1.99 m)	4.95 s	1.69 s	2.87 s	4.32 s	6.84 s	35 in (0.89 m)	9 ft 8 in (2.95 m)	16 reps
All values from NFL Combine/Ohio State's Pro Day

=== 2018 ===
The Cincinnati Bengals selected Hubbard in the third round with the 77th overall pick in the 2018 NFL draft. Hubbard was the seventh defensive end drafted in 2018.

External videos
- Bengals draft Sam Hubbard 77th overall

On June 21, 2018, the Cincinnati Bengals signed Hubbard to a four-year, $3.61 million contract that includes a signing bonus of $929,200.

On September 13, Hubbard recorded his first-career sack against the Baltimore Ravens, bringing down Joe Flacco for a loss of 11 yards in the 34–23 victory. In a Week 5 victory over the Miami Dolphins, he recorded a 19-yard fumble recovery for a touchdown. As a rookie, he totaled 6 sacks, 39 total tackles, nine quarterback hits, seven tackles-for-loss, two passes defensed, one forced fumble, and one fumble recovery.

=== 2019 ===
In the Bengals' 2019 regular season opener, Hubbard recorded two sacks and a career-best 10 tackles in the 21–20 loss to the Seattle Seahawks. In Week 5 against the Arizona Cardinals, Hubbard sacked rookie quarterback Kyler Murray once in the 26–23 loss. In Week 17 against the Cleveland Browns, Hubbard recorded a team high six tackles and sacked Baker Mayfield 1.5 times during the 33–23 win. In the 2019 season, he appeared in and started 15 games. He finished with 8.5 sacks, 76 total tackles (46 solo), three passes defended, and one forced fumble.

=== 2020 ===
In Week 3 against the Philadelphia Eagles, Hubbard recorded his first sack of the season on Carson Wentz during the 23–23 tie game. He suffered an elbow injury in Week 5 and was placed on injured reserve on October 15, 2020. He was activated on November 14, 2020. He started and appeared in 13 games. He recorded two sacks, 62 total tackles (33 solo), three passes defended, and one forced fumble.

=== 2021 ===
On July 25, 2021, Hubbard signed a four-year, $40 million contract extension with the Bengals. Hubbard had a 2.5-sack game against the Ravens in Week 7, a 41–17 victory. In the 2021 season, Hubbard finished with 7.5 sacks, 62 total tackles (33 solo), three passes defended, and one forced fumble.

In the fourth quarter of the AFC Championship against the Kansas City Chiefs, Hubbard strip sacked Patrick Mahomes in the red zone which forced the Chiefs to kick a field goal to tie the game and send the Bengals into overtime in the eventual 27–24 win. In Super Bowl LVI, Hubbard had eight total tackles against the Los Angeles Rams in the 23–20 loss.

=== 2022 ===
In the 2022 season, Hubbard finished with 6.5 sacks, 60 total tackles (34 solo), three passes defended, and one forced fumble in 15 games and starts.

On January 15, 2023, in the Wild Card Round against the Ravens, Hubbard scored a 98-yard touchdown in the fourth quarter off of a fumble by Tyler Huntley that was forced by Logan Wilson. This became the longest fumble return touchdown in NFL postseason history, as well as the longest touchdown in Bengals playoff history, and the longest go-ahead touchdown in the fourth quarter in NFL playoff history. It has since been nicknamed the "Fumble in the Jungle." This play proved to be the deciding factor in the game, as the Bengals went on to win 24–17.

=== 2023 ===
During the 2023 season, Hubbard played in 15 games and had six sacks, 58 tackles, and two fumble recoveries.

=== 2024 ===
On December 15, 2024, in Cincinnati's game against the Tennessee Titans, Hubbard scored his first career offensive touchdown on a two–yard reception from quarterback Joe Burrow. The next day, it was announced that Hubbard would miss the remainder of the season with a PCL injury. He finished the 2024 season with two sacks, 41 tackles, one interception, two passes defended, and one forced fumble.

=== Retirement ===
On March 5, 2025, Hubbard announced on Instagram his retirement from the NFL, after rumors circulated that the Bengals were looking to trade him. He finished his career with 398 total tackles, 55 tackles for a loss, 38.5 sacks, six forced fumbles, five fumble recoveries, 16 passes defended, one interception, and three touchdowns (two defensive and one offensive).

== Personal life ==
In 2021, Hubbard incorporated the Sam Hubbard Foundation. In recognition of his support for his community the Bengals selected him as their nominee for the Walter Payton NFL Man of the Year Award in 2021 and 2022. After announcing his retirement, Hubbard married Jessica Koehler on April 12, 2025.

== NFL career statistics ==
Legend
**Bold**	Career high

=== Regular season ===
Year	Team	Games		Tackles				Fumbles				Interceptions					
Year	Team	GP	GS	Cmb	Solo	Ast	Sck	FF	FR	Yds	TD	PD	Int	Yds	Avg	Lng	TD
2018	CIN	16	0	39	27	12	6.0	**1**	1	19	**1**	2	0	0	0	0	0
2019	CIN	15	15	**76**	**46**	**30**	**8.5**	**1**	0	0	0	**3**	0	0	0	0	0
2020	CIN	13	13	62	33	29	2.0	**1**	0	0	0	**3**	0	0	0	0	0
2021	CIN	16	16	62	33	29	7.5	**1**	**2**	**43**	0	**3**	0	0	0	0	0
2022	CIN	15	15	60	34	26	6.5	**1**	0	0	0	**3**	0	0	0	0	0
2023	CIN	15	15	58	38	20	6.0	0	**2**	0	0	0	0	0	0	0	0
2024	CIN	14	14	41	25	16	2.0	**1**	0	0	0	2	**1**	0	0	0	0
Career		104	88	398	236	162	38.5	6	5	62	1	16	1	0	0	0	0

=== Postseason ===
Year	Team	Games		Tackles				Fumbles				Interceptions					
Year	Team	GP	GS	Cmb	Solo	Ast	Sck	FF	FR	Yds	TD	PD	Int	Yds	Avg	Lng	TD
2021	CIN	4	4	**22**	**13**	**9**	**3.0**	0	0	0	0	**1**	0	0	0	0	0
2022	CIN	3	3	7	4	3	1.0	0	**2**	**98**	**1**	0	0	0	0	0	0
Career		7	7	29	17	12	4.0	0	2	98	1	1	0	0	0	0	0
