= Mitchell Wilcox =

American football player (born 1996)

Profile
- Position: Tight end

Personal information
- Born: November 7, 1996 (age 29); Largo, Florida, U.S.
- Listed height: 6 ft 4 in (1.93 m)
- Listed weight: 250 lb (113 kg)

Career information
- High school: Tarpon Springs
- College: South Florida (2015–2019)
- NFL draft: 2020: undrafted

Career history
- Cincinnati Bengals (2020–2023); New England Patriots (2024)

Awards and highlights
- First-team All-AAC (2018); Second-team All-AAC (2016)

Career NFL statistics as of 2024
- Receptions: 29
- Receiving yards: 211
- Receiving touchdowns: 1
- Stats at Pro Football Reference

Mitchell Wilcox (born November 7, 1996) is an American professional football tight end. He played college football for the South Florida Bulls.

== Early life ==
Wilcox, born in Largo, Florida, is the youngest child in the family to Chuck and Carole Wilcox. Wilcox's father served in the US Coast Guard, reaching the rank of Commander. Wilcox's grandfather also served in the US Coast Guard, reaching the rank of Captain. Wilcox attended Tarpon Springs High School and was a standout two-sport athlete. His senior year he helped his varsity basketball team reach their first ever FHSAA Final Four in school history. Averaging 5.8 ppg, 5.1 rpg, and 0.8 apg. Wilcox played alongside Gigantes de Carolina's Scottie James.

== College career ==
Wilcox was a member of the South Florida Bulls for five seasons, redshirting his true freshman season. Wilcox finished his collegiate career with 100 receptions, 1,326 receiving yards, and 11 touchdowns, all of which are school records for tight ends.

=== Statistics ===
| Year | School | Conf | Class | Pos | G | Rec | Yds | Avg | TD |
|---|---|---|---|---|---|---|---|---|---|
| 2016 | USF | American | FR | TE | 9 | 12 | 278 | 23.2 | 2 |
| 2017 | USF | American | SO | TE | 9 | 17 | 158 | 9.3 | 2 |
| 2018 | USF | American | JR | TE | 10 | 43 | 540 | 12.6 | 2 |
| 2019 | USF | American | SR | TE | 11 | 28 | 350 | 12.5 | 5 |
| Career | | | | | 39 | 100 | 1,326 | 13.3 | 11 |

== Professional career ==
Pre-draft measurables
| Height | Weight | Arm length | Hand span | 40-yard dash | 10-yard split | 20-yard split | 20-yard shuttle | Three-cone drill | Vertical jump | Broad jump |
|---|---|---|---|---|---|---|---|---|---|---|
| 6 ft 3 1/2 in (1.92 m) | 247 lb (112 kg) | 32 1/4 in (0.82 m) | 9 1/8 in (0.23 m) | 4.88 s | 1.65 s | 2.86 s | 4.43 s | 7.37 s | 31.0 in (0.79 m) | 9 ft 4 in (2.84 m) |
All values from NFL Combine

=== Cincinnati Bengals ===
Wilcox signed with the Cincinnati Bengals as an undrafted free agent on April 27, 2020. He was waived during final roster cuts on September 5, 2020, and signed to the practice squad the next day. Wilcox was signed to the Bengals' active roster on January 1, 2021. Wilcox made the Bengals' 53-man roster out of training camp at the start of the 2021 season.

On April 8, 2022, Wilcox re-signed with the Bengals on a one-year contract. In Week 1 against the Pittsburgh Steelers, long snapper Clark Harris suffered a biceps injury. As backup long snapper Cal Adomitis was inactive, Wilcox was called upon as an emergency option to fill in for Harris. After what seemed to be a game winning touchdown catch by Ja'Marr Chase, a slow snap to punter Kevin Huber led to Minkah Fitzpatrick blocking the extra point kick. Another high snap to Huber in overtime led to Evan McPherson missing a field goal, leading to a 23–20 Bengals loss.

In Week 15 against the Tampa Bay Buccaneers, Wilcox scored his first career touchdown on a 12 yard pass from Joe Burrow in the red zone.

On July 24, 2023, Wilcox re-signed with the Bengals.

=== New England Patriots ===
On April 22, 2024, Wilcox signed with the New England Patriots. He was released on August 27, and re-signed to the practice squad.
