= Delonte Hood =

American gridiron football player (born 2000)

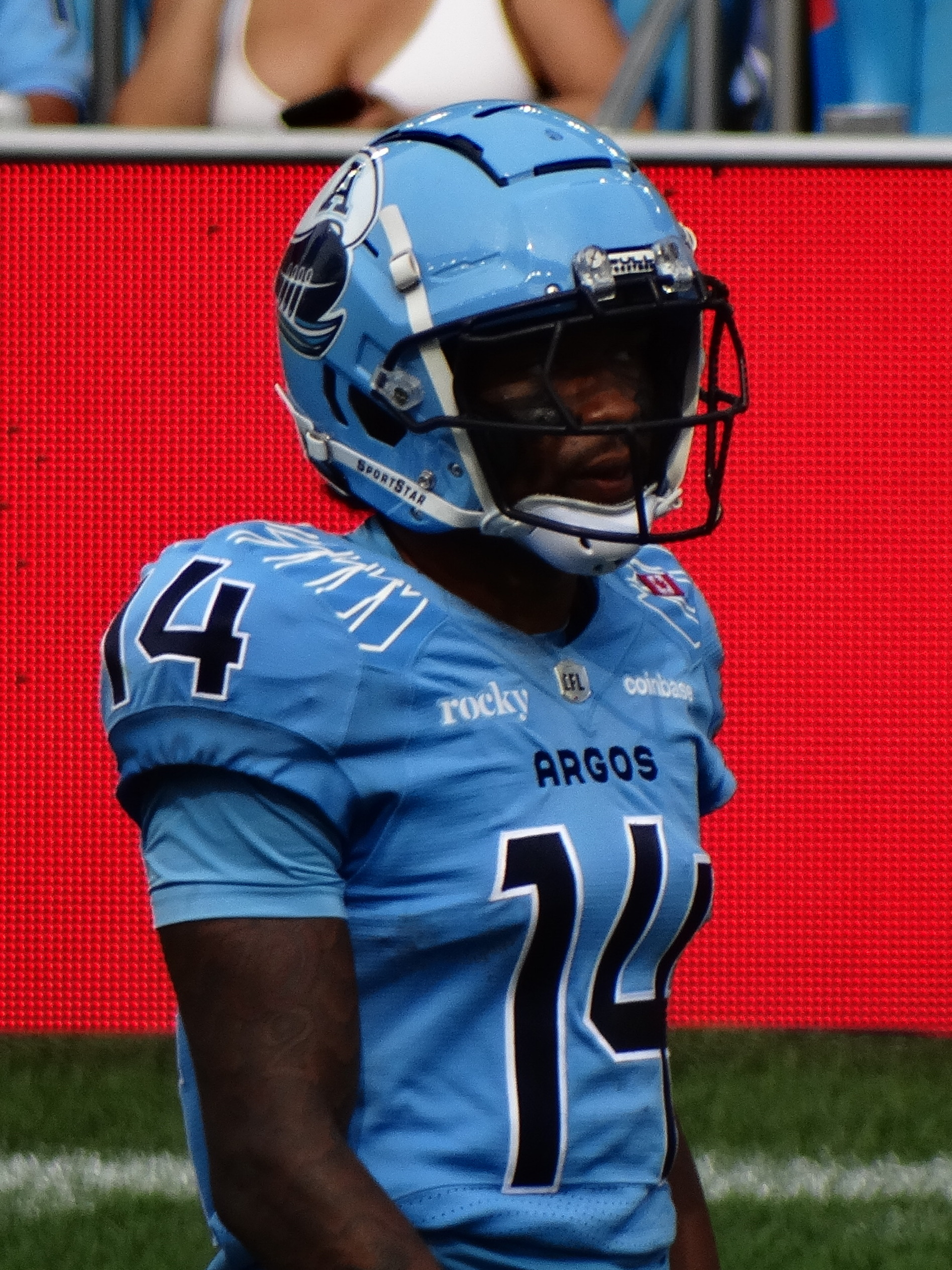
- Hood with the Toronto Argonauts in 2025

No. 14, 9
- Position: Defensive back

Personal information
- Born: October 17, 2000 (age 26); Washington, D.C., U.S.
- Listed height: 5 ft 11 in (1.80 m)
- Listed weight: 192 lb (87 kg)

Career information
- High school: Dunbar (Washington, D.C.)
- College: Glenville State (2018–2019); Toledo (2020); Peru State (2021)
- NFL draft: 2022: undrafted

Career history
- Cincinnati Bengals (2022)*; Denver Broncos (2022–2023)*; Arlington Renegades (2024); Arizona Cardinals (2024)*; Arlington Renegades (2025)*; Toronto Argonauts (2025)
- * Offseason or practice squad member only

Awards and highlights
- First-team All-MEC (2019)
- Stats at CFL.ca

Delonte Hood (born October 17, 2000) is an American professional football defensive back. He played college football at Glenville State, Toledo, and Peru State College. He also played for the Cincinnati Bengals, Denver Broncos, and Arizona Cardinals of the National Football League (NFL), the Arlington Renegades of the United Football League (UFL), and the Toronto Argonauts of the Canadian Football League (CFL).

== College career ==
Hood began his college career at Glenville State where he played two seasons while playing in 22 games while recording 9 interceptions and 63 tackles. He also made first-team All-Mountain East Conference in 2019. Hood transferred to Toledo in 2020, but did not record any stats. He transferred to Peru State College in 2021 where he recorded 1 interception and 22 tackles. Prior to the 2022 NFL draft, Hood had his Pro Day at the University of Nebraska where he ran a 4.38 40-yard dash, a 6.84 three-cone drill, and 12 bench press reps.

== Professional career ==
Pre-draft measurables
Height	Weight	Arm length	Hand span	Wingspan	40-yard dash	10-yard split	20-yard split	20-yard shuttle	Three-cone drill	Vertical jump	Broad jump	Bench press
5 ft 11 1/4 in (1.81 m)	192 lb (87 kg)	32 1/8 in (0.82 m)	10 in (0.25 m)	6 ft 4 3/4 in (1.95 m)	4.42 s	1.65 s	2.55 s	4.20 s	6.95 s	35.0 in (0.89 m)	10 ft 5 in (3.18 m)	12 reps
All values from Pro Day

=== Cincinnati Bengals ===
After going undrafted in the 2022 NFL draft, Hood signed with the Cincinnati Bengals on May 2, 2022. He played in the teams preseason game vs the New York Giants where he recorded three tackles and one pass deflection. He was released on August 30, 2022.

=== Denver Broncos ===
On December 22, 2022, the Denver Broncos signed Hood to their practice squad. He was released on August 27, 2023.

=== Arlington Renegades (first stint) ===
On November 21, 2023, Hood signed with the Arlington Renegades of the United Football League (UFL), who drafted him in 2022. His contract was terminated on August 5, 2024.

=== Arizona Cardinals ===
Hood signed with the Arizona Cardinals on August 6, 2024. He was waived on August 26.

=== Arlington Renegades (second stint) ===
On November 18, 2024, Hood re-signed with the Renegades. He was released on March 20, 2025.

=== Toronto Argonauts ===
On October 8, 2024, Hood signed a futures contract with the Toronto Argonauts.
