= Tee Higgins =

American football player (born 1999)

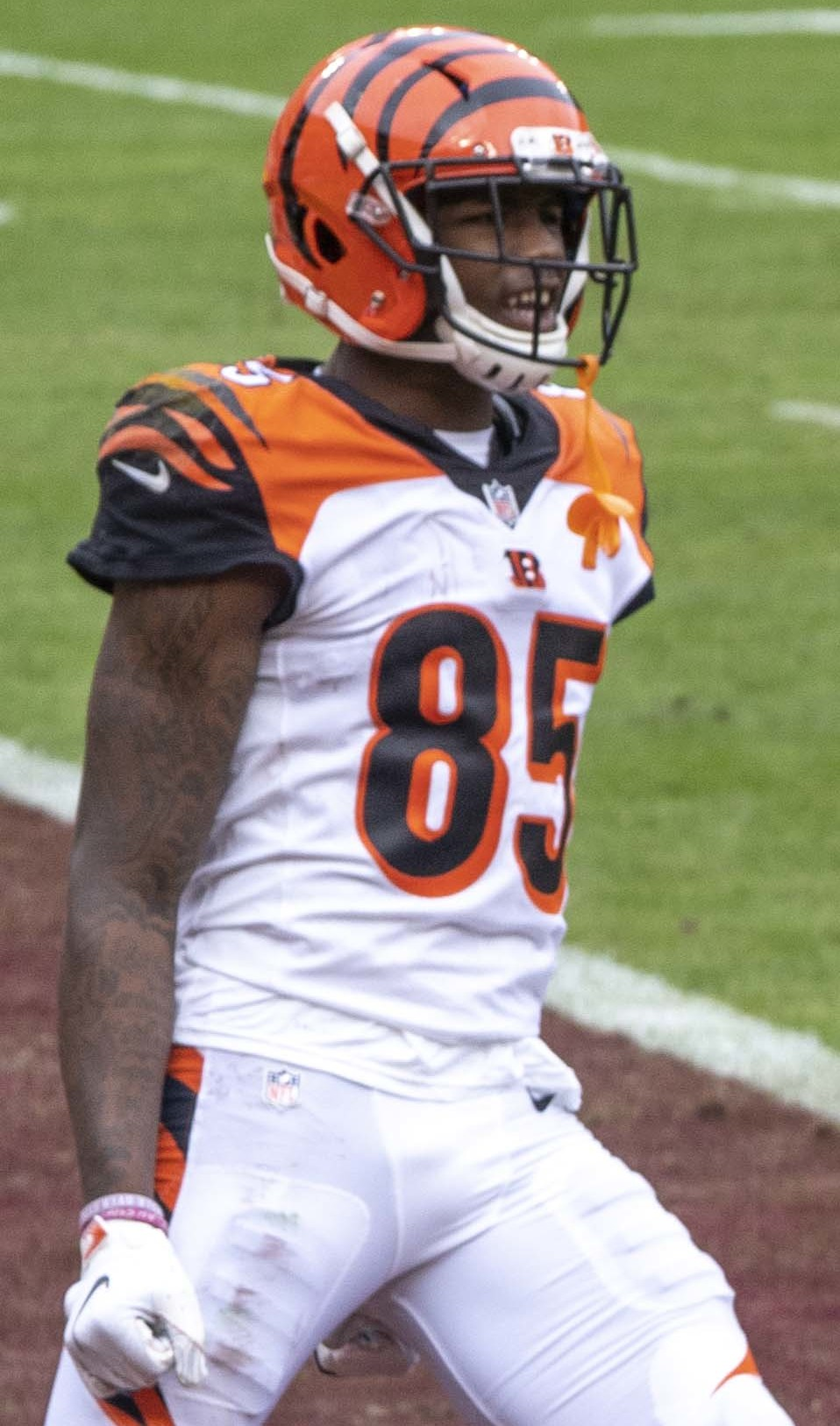
- Higgins with the Cincinnati Bengals in 2020

No. 5 – Cincinnati Bengals
- Position: Wide receiver
- Roster status: Active

Personal information
- Born: January 18, 1999 (age 27); Oak Ridge, Tennessee, U.S.
- Listed height: 6 ft 4 in (1.93 m)
- Listed weight: 220 lb (100 kg)

Career information
- High school: Oak Ridge
- College: Clemson (2017–2019)
- NFL draft: 2020: 2nd round, 33rd overall pick

Career history
- Cincinnati Bengals (2020–present)

Awards and highlights
- Pro Bowl (2025); CFP national champion (2018); First-team All-ACC (2019); Second-team All-ACC (2018)

Career NFL statistics as of Week 10, 2026
- Receptions: 442
- Receiving yards: 6,265
- Receiving touchdowns: 51
- Stats at Pro Football Reference

Tamaurice William "Tee" Higgins (born January 18, 1999) is an American professional football wide receiver for the Cincinnati Bengals of the National Football League (NFL). He played college football for the Clemson Tigers, where he won the 2019 College Football Playoff National Championship as a sophomore, and was selected by the Bengals with the first pick in the second round of the 2020 NFL draft.

== Early life ==
Higgins attended Oak Ridge High School in Oak Ridge, Tennessee. As a senior, he had 68 receptions for 1,044 yards and 18 touchdowns. A five star recruit, Higgins originally committed to the University of Tennessee to play college football before changing to Clemson University.

Higgins also played basketball in high school and was offered scholarships to play college basketball by numerous schools.

== College career ==
As a freshman at Clemson in 2017, Higgins played in 13 games and had 17 receptions for 345 yards and two touchdowns.

Higgins entered his sophomore season in 2018 as a starter. In the College Football Playoff National Championship, he had three receptions for 81 yards in the 44–16 victory over Alabama. He finished with 59 receptions for 936 receiving yards and 12 receiving touchdowns.

In his junior season, Higgins had 1,167 receiving yards and 13 touchdowns as his team finished with a 14–1 record, making it all the way to the National Championship, which Clemson lost to LSU by a score of 42–25. Higgins had a 36-yard rushing touchdown and caught 3 passes for 52 yards in the game. Higgins decided to forgo his final year of eligibility and declare for the 2020 NFL draft.

== Professional career ==
Pre-draft measurables
Height	Weight	Arm length	Hand span	Wingspan	40-yard dash	10-yard split	20-yard split	20-yard shuttle	Vertical jump	Broad jump	Wonderlic
6 ft 3 5/8 in (1.92 m)	216 lb (98 kg)	34 1/8 in (0.87 m)	9 1/4 in (0.23 m)	6 ft 9 in (2.06 m)	4.59 s	1.66 s	2.72 s	4.53 s	31.0 in (0.79 m)	10 ft 3 in (3.12 m)	11
All values from NFL Combine/Pro Day

=== 2020 ===
In the 2020 NFL draft, Higgins was selected by the Cincinnati Bengals in the second round with the 33rd overall pick. On July 28, 2020, Higgins signed his rookie deal, a four-year contract worth $8.6 million.

Higgins made his NFL debut in Week 1 of the 2020 season against the Los Angeles Chargers. In Week 2, he recorded his first three professional receptions for 35 yards against the Cleveland Browns on Thursday Night Football. In Week 3, against the Philadelphia Eagles, Higgins had five receptions for 40 yards and his first two professional receiving touchdowns in the 23–23 tie. In Week 6 against the Indianapolis Colts, he had six receptions for 125 receiving yards in the 31–27 loss. In Week 10 against the Pittsburgh Steelers, he had seven receptions for 115 receiving yards and one receiving touchdown during the 36–10 loss.

Higgins finished his rookie season with 67 receptions for 908 yards and six receiving touchdowns. His 67 catches tied a Bengals rookie record set by Cris Collinsworth in 1981. The record was broken the following year by rookie wide receiver Ja'Marr Chase, with 81 receptions. His 908 receiving yards ranked him third among all rookie receivers in 2020.

=== 2021 ===
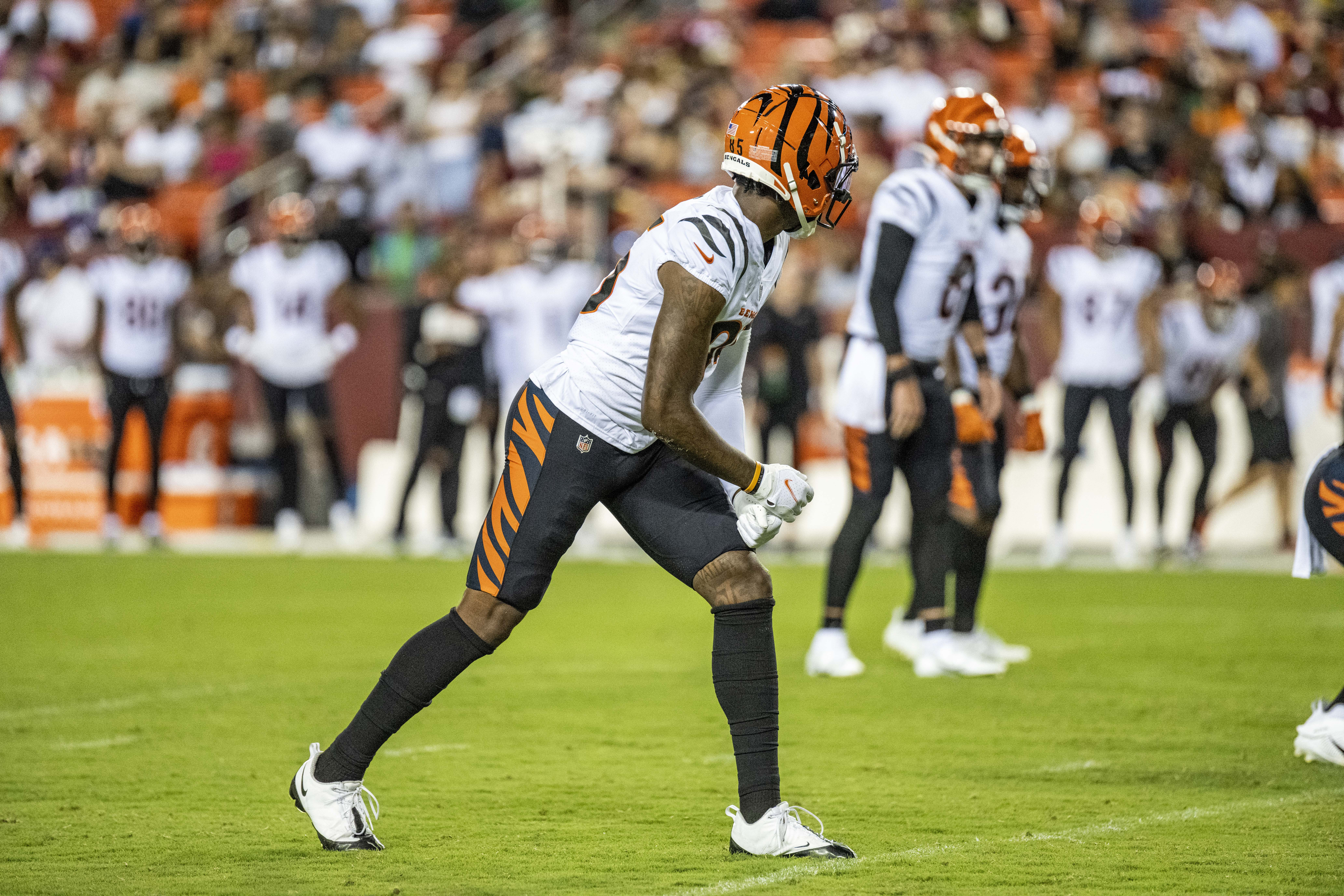
Higgins in 2021

In Week 12, against the Steelers, Higgins had six receptions for 114 receiving yards and a touchdown in the 41–10 victory. In the following game, he had nine receptions for 138 yards and a touchdown in the 41–22 loss to the Chargers. In Week 16, against the Baltimore Ravens, he had 12 receptions for 194 receiving yards and two receiving touchdowns in the 41–21 victory. Higgins finished the 2021 regular season with 74 receptions for 1,091 yards and six receiving touchdowns in 14 games played, improving upon his rookie season. In the Divisional Round against the Tennessee Titans, Higgins recorded 7 receptions for 96 yards in the 19–16 win. In the AFC Championship Game against the Kansas City Chiefs, Higgins caught six passes for 103 yards, leading the Bengals in receiving yards in the 27–24 overtime win to advance to Super Bowl LVI.

In Super Bowl LVI, Higgins scored the Bengals' first touchdown of the game, a 6-yard pass from Joe Mixon. On the first play from scrimmage of the second half, Higgins scored a 75-yard touchdown pass, his second touchdown of the game. Higgins finished the game catching four passes for 100 yards, the most receiving yards by a player on either team in the 23–20 loss.

=== 2022 ===
In Week 1 against the Steelers, Higgins left the game in the second quarter with a concussion. In Week 4 against the Miami Dolphins, Higgins had seven receptions for 124 yards, including a touchdown. In Week 11, against the Pittsburgh Steelers, he had nine receptions for 148 receiving yards in the 37–30 victory. In the following game against the Titans, he had seven receptions for 114 yards and a touchdown in the 20–16 victory. In Week 16 against the New England Patriots, he had eight receptions for 128 receiving yards and one receiving touchdown in the 22–18 victory.

In a Week 17 game against the Buffalo Bills, after making a catch near midfield, Higgins was tackled by Damar Hamlin. After the play, Hamlin stood up but immediately collapsed; it was later determined that the impact of the play caused commotio cordis. First responders initiated CPR and administered defibrillation on the field. The game was ultimately postponed and cancelled. Higgins, distraught and guilt-ridden by his involvement in the play that caused Hamlin to collapse, kept in touch with Hamlin and his family as he recovered and exchanged prayers with them. Following the incident, donations to a charity Higgins supported increased rapidly in support of Hamlin. Hamlin ultimately made a full recovery and returned to the Bills for the 2023 season, and Higgins and Hamlin subsequently have become friends.

Higgins finished the 2022 season with 74 receptions for 1,029 receiving yards and seven receiving touchdowns. He had six receptions for 83 yards and a touchdown in the 23–20 loss to the Chiefs in the AFC Championship.

=== 2023 ===
Higgins announced in September 2021 that he planned on switching his jersey number from No. 85 back to No. 5, his old college number. Higgins stated that he often saw on social media that many users were nicknaming him "Ochocinco 2.0" (in reference to former Bengals receiver Chad Johnson), with Higgins stating "I don't want to be a 2.0. [I want] to be Tee Higgins 1.0 and make a name for myself [in] this organization". However, he was unable to change his number in time for the 2022 season, instead with the change taking effect in 2023.

In Week 2 against the Ravens, Higgins had a two-touchdown game, with 8 receptions for 89 yards in the 27–24 loss. During the Bengals' Week 4 game against the Tennessee Titans, Higgins suffered a rib injury and was ruled out for the remainder of that game, as well as the following week against the Arizona Cardinals. He had his first 100-yard game of the season in Week 9 against the Bills, making eight catches for 110 yards. On November 8, 2023, Higgins injured his hamstring during practice, and was ruled inactive for the following three games. He returned in Week 13 against the Jacksonville Jaguars.

During the Bengals' Week 17 loss against the Kansas City Chiefs, Higgins re-aggravated his previous hamstring injury, leading to him being ruled inactive for the final game of the season against the Cleveland Browns. He finished the season with career lows in all major statistical categories, with 656 yards on 42 receptions and five touchdowns.

=== 2024 ===
On February 26, 2024, the Bengals placed the franchise tag on Higgins. On June 17, 2024, Higgins re-signed with the Bengals on a one-year contract. He sat out the first two games of the Bengals' season with a hamstring injury. He made his season debut against the Washington Commanders in Week 3. Higgins had two touchdowns and 83 yards on nine catches in the Bengals Week 5 loss to the Baltimore Ravens.

=== 2025 ===
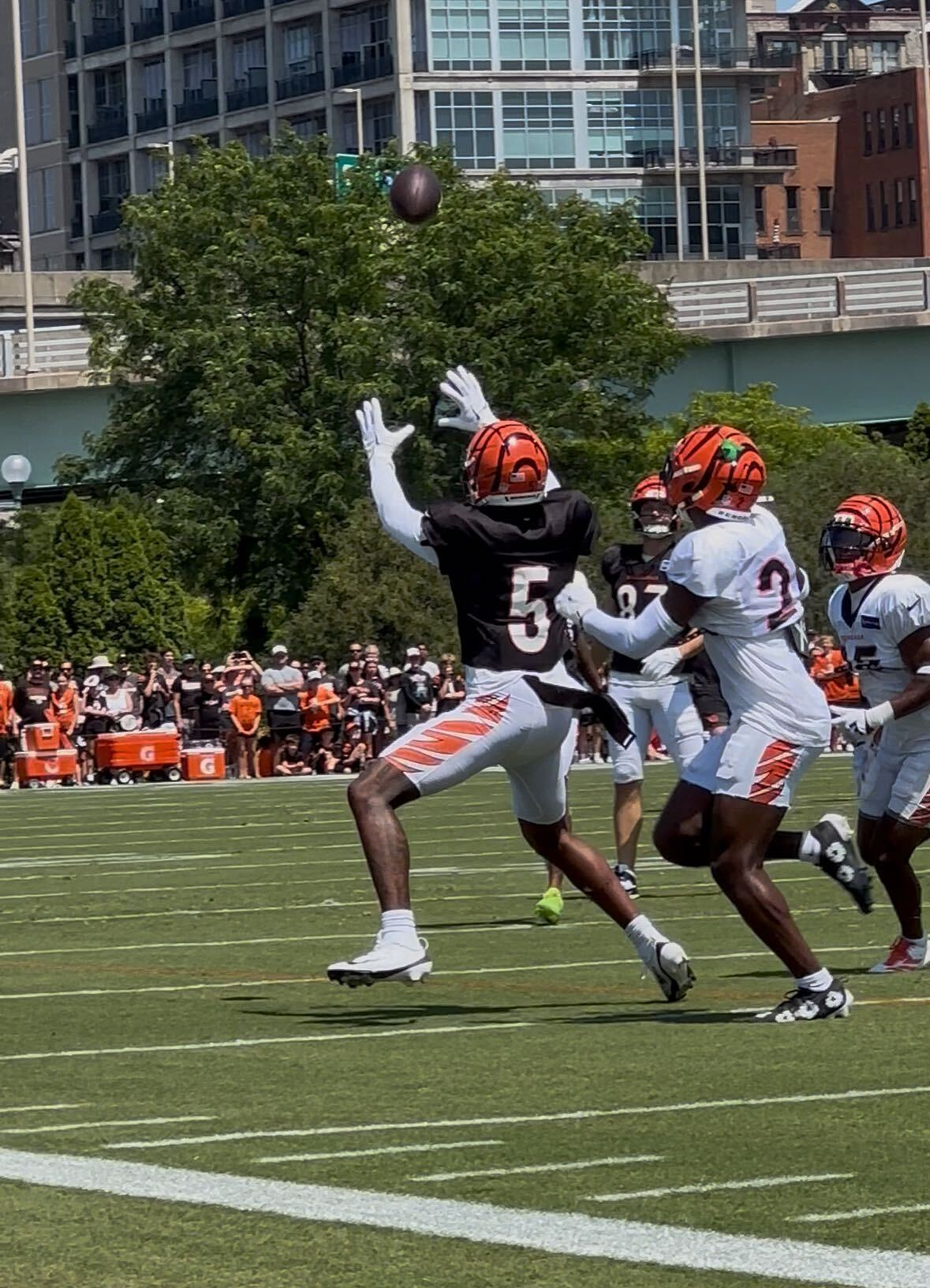
Tee Higgins catches a ball at Cincinnati Bengals training camp in August 2025

On March 3, 2025, the Bengals placed the franchise tag on Higgins for the second year in a row. He then signed a four-year, $115 million contract extension two weeks later. He had 59 receptions for 846 yards and 11 touchdowns in the 2025 season.

=== 2026 ===
In Week 8, Higgins recorded 10 catches for 155 yards and two touchdowns in a 43-36 overtime win over the Tennessee Titans, earning AFC Offensive Player of the Week.

== Career statistics ==
Legend
	Led the league
**Bold**	Career high

=== NFL ===
==== Regular season ====
Year	Team	Games		Receiving						Rushing					Fumbles	
Year	Team	GP	GS	Tgt	Rec	Yds	Avg	Lng	TD	Att	Yds	Avg	Lng	TD	Fum	Lost
2020	CIN	16	14	108	67	908	13.6	67	6	5	28	5.6	13	0	**1**	**1**
2021	CIN	14	14	**110**	**74**	**1,091**	14.7	54	6	0	0	0.0	0	0	**1**	**1**
2022	CIN	16	14	109	**74**	1,029	13.9	59	7	0	0	0.0	0	0	0	0
2023	CIN	12	11	76	42	656	15.6	**80**	5	0	0	0.0	0	0	0	0
2024	CIN	12	9	109	73	911	12.5	42	10	0	0	0.0	0	0	**1**	**1**
2025	CIN	15	14	98	59	846	14.3	44	**11**	0	0	0.0	0	0	0	0
2026	CIN	9	9	73	53	824	**15.5**	44	6	0	0	0.0	0	0	0	0
Career		94	85	683	442	6,265	14.2	80	51	5	28	5.6	13	0	3	3

==== Postseason ====
Year	Team	Games		Receiving						Fumbles	
Year	Team	GP	GS	Tgt	Rec	Yds	Avg	Lng	TD	Fum	Lost
2021	CIN	4	3	**30**	**18**	**309**	**17.2**	**75**	**2**	0	0
2022	CIN	3	3	21	13	148	11.4	27	1	0	0
Career		7	6	51	31	457	14.7	75	3	0	0

=== College ===
Season	GP	Receiving				Rushing			
Season	GP	Rec	Yds	Avg	TD	Att	Yds	Avg	TD
2017	7	17	345	**20.3**	2	0	0	0.0	0
2018	15	**59**	936	15.9	12	0	0	0.0	0
2019	15	**59**	**1,167**	19.8	**13**	**1**	**36**	**36.0**	**1**
Career	37	135	2,448	18.1	27	1	36	36.0	1
