= 2016 Tennessee Titans season =

57th season in franchise history

- Owner: KSA Industries
- General manager: Jon Robinson
- Head coach: Mike Mularkey
- Home stadium: Nissan Stadium

Results
- Record: 9–7
- Division place: 2nd AFC South
- Playoffs: Did not qualify
- All-Pros: 1: RT Jack Conklin (1st team)
- Pro Bowlers: 5: DT Jurrell Casey; OT Taylor Lewan; RB DeMarco Murray; OLB Brian Orakpo; TE Delanie Walker

Uniform
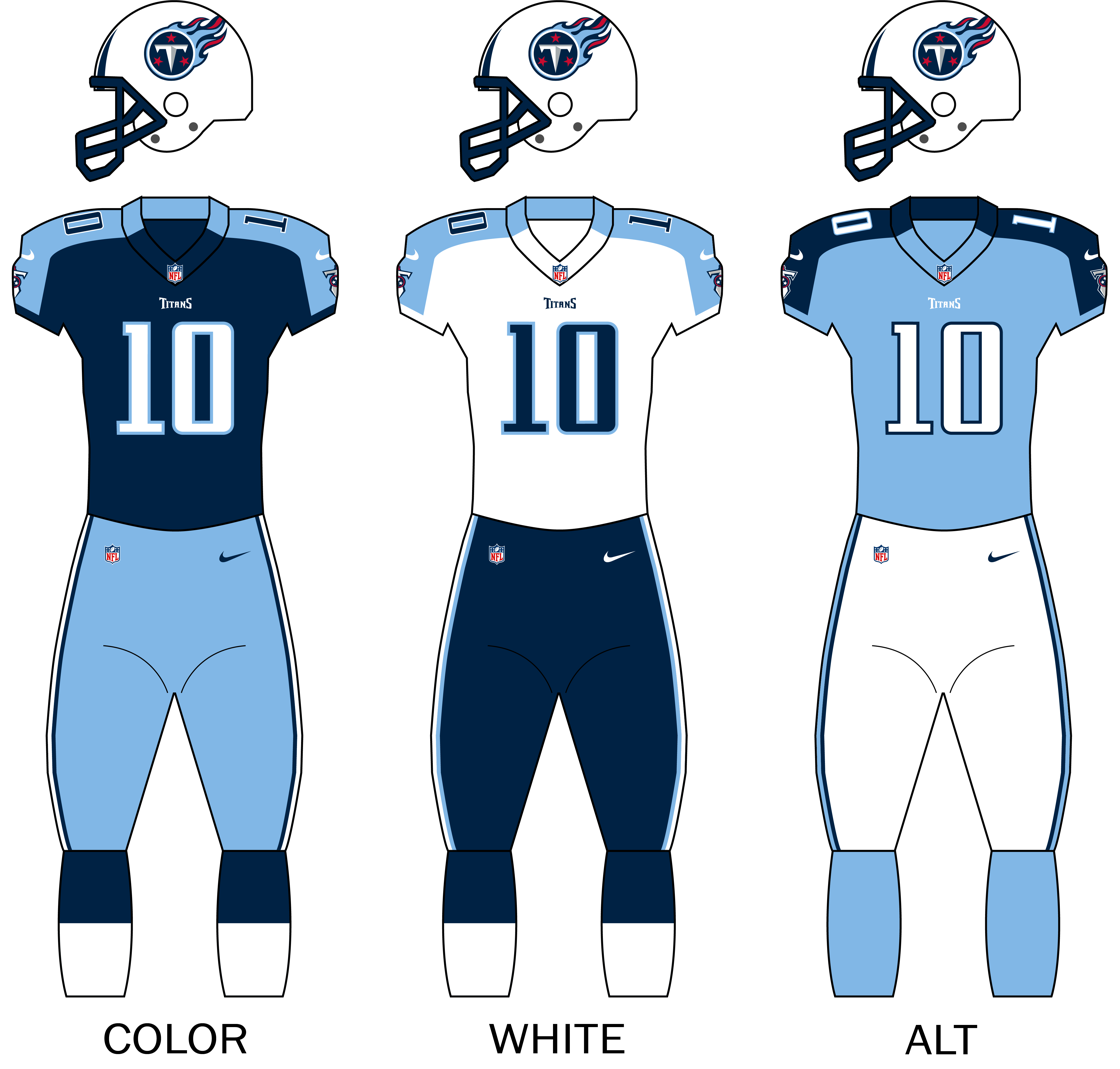

The 2016 season was the Tennessee Titans' 47th in the National Football League (NFL) and their 57th overall. It also marked the franchise's 20th season in the state of Tennessee as well as the first full season under head coach Mike Mularkey, who served as the team's interim head coach for the last nine games of the 2015 season.

The Titans tripled their win total from 2015 and achieved their first winning season since 2011. However, the team missed the playoffs for the eighth consecutive season tying a record set between 1970–1977. The team finished tied with the Houston Texans for the AFC South division title but lost the tiebreaker because the Texans had a better division record (5–1) than the Titans (2–4).

== Draft ==
2016 Tennessee Titans Draft
Round	Selection	Player	Position	College
1	8	Jack Conklin	OT	Michigan State
2	33	Kevin Dodd	DE	Clemson
2	43	Austin Johnson	DT	Penn State
2	45	Derrick Henry	RB	Alabama
3	64	Kevin Byard	S	MTSU
5	140	Tajae Sharpe	WR	UMass
5	157	LeShaun Sims	CB	Southern Utah
6	193	Sebastian Tretola	OG	Arkansas
7	222	Aaron Wallace	OLB	UCLA
7	253	Kalan Reed	CB	Southern Miss

Notes

- The Titans acquired an additional sixth-round selection in a trade that sent guard Andy Levitre and a future conditional selection to the Atlanta Falcons.
- The Titans traded a conditional seventh-round selection to the Cleveland Browns in exchange for running back Terrance West.

== Staff ==
2016 Tennessee Titans staff
Front office: Owner – KSA Industries; President, chairman and CEO – Steve Underwood; Executive vice president and general manager – Jon Robinson; Assistant director of football administration – Dennis Polian; Vice president of football administration – Vin Marino; Director of player personnel – Ryan Cowden; Director of college scouting – Blake Beddingfield; Director of pro scouting – Brian Gardner; Head coaches: Head coach – Mike Mularkey; Assistant head coach/defensive coordinator – Dick LeBeau; Offensive coaches: Offensive coordinator – Terry Robiskie; Quarterbacks – Jason Michael; Running backs – Sylvester Croom; Wide receivers – Bob Bratkowski; Assistant wide receivers – Jason Tucker; Tight ends – Arthur Smith; Offensive line – Russ Grimm; Assistant offensive line – Mike Sullivan; Offensive assistant – Luke Steckel	Defensive coaches: Defensive line – Nick Eason; Assistant defensive line – Keith Willis; Linebackers – Lou Spanos; Defensive backs − Deshea Townsend; Assistant defensive backs – Steve Jackson; Defensive assistant – Brandon Blaney; Special teams coaches: Special teams coordinator – Bobby April; Assistant Special teams coach – Steve Hoffman; Strength and conditioning: Head strength and conditioning – Steve Watterson; Assistant strength and conditioning – Tom Kanavy

== Final roster ==
2016 Tennessee Titans roster
Quarterbacks (QB): 16 Matt Cassel; 11 Alex Tanney; Running backs (RB): 26 Antonio Andrews; 45 Jalston Fowler; 22 Derrick Henry; 29 DeMarco Murray; Wide receivers (WR): 83 Harry Douglas; 87 Marc Mariani; 18 Rishard Matthews; 10 Tre McBride; 19 Tajae Sharpe; 13 Kendall Wright; Tight ends (TE): 88 Jace Amaro; 80 Anthony Fasano; 89 Phillip Supernaw; 82 Delanie Walker	Offensive linemen (OL): 78 Jack Conklin T; 60 Ben Jones C; 71 Dennis Kelly T; 64 Josh Kline G; 77 Taylor Lewan T; 62 Brian Schwenke G/C; 67 Quinton Spain G; 79 Sebastian Tretola G; Defensive linemen (DL): 95 Angelo Blackson; 99 Jurrell Casey DE; 94 Austin Johnson DE; 90 DaQuan Jones; 96 Al Woods NT; 75 Antwaun Woods NT	Linebackers (LB): 51 David Bass OLB; 91 Derrick Morgan OLB; 98 Brian Orakpo OLB; 50 Nate Palmer OLB; 55 Sean Spence ILB; 57 Justin Staples OLB; 52 Aaron Wallace OLB; 54 Avery Williamson ILB; 59 Wesley Woodyard ILB; Defensive backs (DB): 47 Valentino Blake CB; 31 Kevin Byard FS; 25 Rashad Johnson FS; 23 Brice McCain CB; 30 Jason McCourty CB; 37 Kalan Reed CB; 35 Curtis Riley CB; 21 Da'Norris Searcy SS; 36 LeShaun Sims CB; 38 D'Joun Smith CB; 24 Daimion Stafford SS; Special teams (ST): 48 Beau Brinkley LS; 6 Brett Kern P; 4 Ryan Succop K	Practice squad: 61 Karim Barton G; 56 Kourtnei Brown OLB; 84 Jerome Cunningham TE; 32 David Fluellen RB; 17 Jonathan Krause WR; 68 Tyler Marz T; 14 K. J. Maye WR; 33 Jeremiah McKinnon CB; 41 J. R. Tavai OLB; Reserve: 92 Mehdi Abdesmad DE (IR); 76 Byron Bell T (IR); 93 Kevin Dodd OLB (IR); 97 Karl Klug DE (IR); 66 Josue Matías G (IR); 8 Marcus Mariota QB (IR); 23 Bennett Okotcha CB (IR); 70 Chance Warmack G (IR); Rookies in italics 53 active, 8 reserve, 9 practice squad

=== Team captains ===
- Marcus Mariota (QB)
- Delanie Walker (TE)
- Jurrell Casey (DE)
- Brian Orakpo (LB)
- Wesley Woodyard (LB)
- Daimion Stafford (ST)

== Schedule ==
=== Preseason ===
Week	Date	Opponent	Result	Record	Venue	Recap
1	August 13	San Diego Chargers	**W** 27–10	1–0	Nissan Stadium	Recap
2	August 20	Carolina Panthers	**L** 16–26	1–1	Nissan Stadium	Recap
3	August 27	at Oakland Raiders	**W** 27–14	2–1	Oakland–Alameda County Coliseum	Recap
4	September 1	at Miami Dolphins	**W** 21–10	3–1	Hard Rock Stadium	Recap

=== Regular season ===
Week	Date	Opponent	Result	Record	Venue	Recap
1	September 11	Minnesota Vikings	**L** 16–25	0–1	Nissan Stadium	Recap
2	September 18	at Detroit Lions	**W** 16–15	1–1	Ford Field	Recap
3	September 25	Oakland Raiders	**L** 10–17	1–2	Nissan Stadium	Recap
4	October 2	at **Houston Texans**	**L** 20–27	1–3	NRG Stadium	Recap
5	October 9	at Miami Dolphins	**W** 30–17	2–3	Hard Rock Stadium	Recap
6	October 16	Cleveland Browns	**W** 28–26	3–3	Nissan Stadium	Recap
7	October 23	**Indianapolis Colts**	**L** 26–34	3–4	Nissan Stadium	Recap
8	October 27	**Jacksonville Jaguars**	**W** 36–22	4–4	Nissan Stadium	Recap
9	November 6	at San Diego Chargers	**L** 35–43	4–5	Qualcomm Stadium	Recap
10	November 13	Green Bay Packers	**W** 47–25	5–5	Nissan Stadium	Recap
11	November 20	at **Indianapolis Colts**	**L** 17–24	5–6	Lucas Oil Stadium	Recap
12	November 27	at Chicago Bears	**W** 27–21	6–6	Soldier Field	Recap
13	Bye					
14	December 11	Denver Broncos	**W** 13–10	7–6	Nissan Stadium	Recap
15	December 18	at Kansas City Chiefs	**W** 19–17	8–6	Arrowhead Stadium	Recap
16	December 24	at **Jacksonville Jaguars**	**L** 17–38	8–7	EverBank Field	Recap
17	January 1	**Houston Texans**	**W** 24–17	9–7	Nissan Stadium	Recap

Note: Intra-division opponents are in bold text.

=== Game summaries ===
==== Week 1: vs. Minnesota Vikings ====
Week One: Minnesota Vikings at Tennessee Titans – Game summary

Quarter	1	2	3	4	Total
**Vikings**	0	0	12	13	**25**
Titans	3	7	0	6	**16**

at Nissan Stadium, Nashville, Tennessee

- Date: September 11
- Game time: 12:00 p.m. CDT
- Game weather: 76 °F (24 °C), sunny
- Game attendance: 63,816
- Referee: Walt Coleman
- TV announcers (Fox): Dick Stockton, Chris Spielman and Kristina Pink
- Recap, Gamebook

Game information

**First quarter**

- TEN – Ryan Succop 28-yard field goal, 4:45. Titans 3–0. **Drive: 8 plays, 53 yards, 4:24.**

**Second quarter**

- TEN – DeMarco Murray 6-yard pass from Marcus Mariota (Ryan Succop kick), 0:41. Titans 10–0. **Drive: 13 plays, 73 yards, 4:14.**

**Third quarter**

- MIN – Blair Walsh 50-yard field goal, 13:56. Titans 10–3. **Drive: 4 plays, 2 yards, 1:04.**
- MIN – Blair Walsh 33-yard field goal, 5:59. Titans 10–6. **Drive: 11 plays, 58 yards, 5:31.**
- MIN – Eric Kendricks 77-yard interception return (kick failed, wide left), 1:24. Vikings 12–10.

**Fourth quarter**

- MIN – Blair Walsh 45-yard field goal, 11:17. Vikings 15–10. **Drive: 10 plays, 42 yards, 4:05.**
- MIN – Danielle Hunter 24-yard fumble return (Blair Walsh kick), 11:03. Vikings 22–10.
- MIN – Blair Walsh 30-yard field goal, 2:36. Vikings 25–10. **Drive: 7 plays, 45 yards, 3:33.**
- TEN – DeMarco Murray 4-yard pass from Marcus Mariota (pass failed), 0:28. Vikings 25–16. **Drive: 9 plays, 74 yards, 2:08.**

**Top passers**

- MIN – Shaun Hill – 18/33, 236 yards
- TEN – Marcus Mariota – 25/41, 271 yards, 2 TD, INT

**Top rushers**

- MIN – Adrian Peterson – 19 rushes, 31 yards
- TEN – DeMarco Murray – 13 rushes, 42 yards

**Top receivers**

- MIN – Stefon Diggs – 7 receptions, 103 yards
- TEN – Tajae Sharpe – 7 receptions, 76 yards

==== Week 2: at Detroit Lions ====
Week Two: Tennessee Titans at Detroit Lions – Game summary

Quarter	1	2	3	4	Total
**Titans**	0	3	0	13	**16**
Lions	9	3	3	0	**15**

at Ford Field, Detroit, Michigan

- Date: September 18
- Game time: 1:00 p.m. EDT/12:00 p.m. CDT
- Game weather: Played indoors (domed stadium)
- Game attendance: 58,466
- Referee: Brad Allen
- TV announcers (CBS): Andrew Catalon, Steve Beuerlein and Steve Tasker
- Recap, Gamebook

Game information

**First quarter**

- DET – DeMarco Murray tackled in end zone by Devin Taylor for a safety, 7:16. Lions 2–0.
- DET – Anquan Boldin 24-yard pass from Matthew Stafford (Matt Prater kick), 4:15. Lions 9–0. **Drive: 8 plays, 79 yards, 3:01.**

**Second quarter**

- TEN – Ryan Succop 46-yard field goal, 12:03. Lions 9–3. **Drive: 14 plays, 47 yards, 7:12.**
- DET – Matt Prater 42-yard field goal, 1:04. Lions 12–3. **Drive: 13 plays, 75 yards, 3:58.**

**Third quarter**

- DET – Matt Prater 27-yard field goal, 1:40. Lions 15–3. **Drive: 14 plays, 63 yards, 7:10.**

**Fourth quarter**

- TEN – Delanie Walker 30-yard pass from Marcus Mariota (Ryan Succop kick), 14:54. Lions 15–10. **Drive: 5 plays, 75 yards, 1:46.**
- TEN – Andre Johnson 9-yard pass from Marcus Mariota (pass failed), 1:13. Titans 16–15. **Drive: 13 plays, 83 yards, 5:51.**

**Top passers**

- TEN – Marcus Mariota – 25/33, 238 yards, 2 TD, INT
- DET – Matthew Stafford – 22/40, 260 yards, TD, INT

**Top rushers**

- TEN – DeMarco Murray – 12 rushes, 89 yards
- DET – Ameer Abdullah – 6 rushes, 38 yards

**Top receivers**

- TEN – Delanie Walker – 6 receptions, 83 yards, TD
- DET – Marvin Jones – 8 receptions, 118 yards

==== Week 3: vs. Oakland Raiders ====
Week Three: Oakland Raiders at Tennessee Titans – Game summary

Quarter	1	2	3	4	Total
**Raiders**	7	10	0	0	**17**
Titans	3	0	7	0	**10**

at Nissan Stadium, Nashville, Tennessee

- Date: September 25
- Game time: 12:00 p.m. CDT
- Game weather: 89 °F (32 °C), sunny
- Game attendance: 62,370
- Referee: Tony Corrente
- TV announcers (CBS): Andrew Catalon, Steve Beuerlein and Steve Tasker
- Recap, Gamebook

Game information

**First quarter**

- TEN – Ryan Succop 34-yard field goal, 9:50. Titans 3–0. **Drive: 10 plays, 59 yards, 5:10.**
- OAK – Latavius Murray 22-yard run (Sebastian Janikowski kick), 8:19. Raiders 7–3. **Drive: 5 plays, 60 yards, 1:31.**

**Second quarter**

- OAK – Sebastian Janikowski 52-yard field goal, 8:13. Raiders 10–3. **Drive: 4 plays, −9 yards, 1:07.**
- OAK – Seth Roberts 19-yard pass from Derek Carr (Sebastian Janikowski kick), 0:33. Raiders 17–3. **Drive: 8 plays, 91 yards, 3:44.**

**Third quarter**

- TEN – DeMarco Murray 5-yard run (Ryan Succop kick), 5:51. Raiders 17–10. **Drive: 7 plays, 93 yards, 3:54.**

**Fourth quarter**

- No scoring plays

**Top passers**

- OAK – Derek Carr – 21/35, 249 yards, TD, INT
- TEN – Marcus Mariota – 17/33, 214 yards, 2 INT

**Top rushers**

- OAK – Latavius Murray – 10 rushes, 37 yards, TD
- TEN – DeMarco Murray – 16 rushes, 114 yards, TD

**Top receivers**

- OAK – Michael Crabtree – 8 receptions, 102 yards
- TEN – DeMarco Murray – 5 receptions, 41 yards

==== Week 4: at Houston Texans ====
Week Four: Tennessee Titans at Houston Texans – Game summary

Quarter	1	2	3	4	Total
Titans	3	14	3	0	**20**
**Texans**	14	6	7	0	**27**

at NRG Stadium, Houston, Texas

- Date: October 2
- Game time: 12:00 p.m. CDT
- Game weather: Played indoors (retractable roof closed)
- Game attendance: 71,054
- Referee: Clete Blakeman
- TV announcers (CBS): Tom McCarthy and Adam Archuleta
- Recap, Gamebook

Game information

**First quarter**

- HOU – C. J. Fiedorowicz 14-yard pass from Brock Osweiler (Nick Novak kick), 10:31. Texans 7–0. **Drive: 9 plays, 75 yards, 4:29.**
- HOU – Will Fuller 5-yard pass from Brock Osweiler (Nick Novak kick), 5:34. Texans 14–0. **Drive: 6 plays, 80 yards, 2:47.**
- TEN – Ryan Succop 48-yard field goal, 2:36. Texans 14–3. **Drive: 7 plays, 42 yards, 2:58.**

**Second quarter**

- HOU – Nick Novak 53-yard field goal, 13:42. Texans 17–3. **Drive: 9 plays, 40 yards, 3:54.**
- TEN – DeMarco Murray 2-yard run (Ryan Succop kick), 11:21. Texans 17–10. **Drive: 5 plays, 78 yards, 2:21.**
- TEN – DeMarco Murray 1-yard run (Ryan Succop kick), 2:28. Tied 17–17. **Drive: 9 plays, 39 yards, 4:16.**
- HOU – Nick Novak 45-yard field goal, 0:07. Texans 20–17. **Drive: 4 plays, 17 yards, 0:39.**

**Third quarter**

- TEN – Ryan Succop 26-yard field goal, 7:04. Tied 20–20. **Drive: 13 plays, 59 yards, 7:56.**
- HOU – Will Fuller 67-yard punt return (Nick Novak kick), 0:56. Texans 27–20.

**Fourth quarter**

- No scoring plays

**Top passers**

- TEN – Marcus Mariota – 13/29, 202 yards, INT
- HOU – Brock Osweiler – 25/37, 254 yards, 2 TD, 2 INT

**Top rushers**

- TEN – DeMarco Murray – 25 rushes, 95 yards, 2 TD
- HOU – Lamar Miller – 19 rushes, 82 yards

**Top receivers**

- TEN – Rishard Matthews – 2 receptions, 82 yards
- HOU – Will Fuller – 7 receptions, 81 yards, TD

==== Week 5: at Miami Dolphins ====
Week Five: Tennessee Titans at Miami Dolphins – Game summary

Quarter	1	2	3	4	Total
**Titans**	7	14	3	6	**30**
Dolphins	0	14	3	0	**17**

at Hard Rock Stadium, Miami Gardens, Florida

- Date: October 9
- Game time: 1:00 p.m. EDT/12:00 p.m. CDT
- Game weather: 88 °F (31 °C), partly cloudy
- Game attendance: 64,425
- Referee: Craig Wrolstad
- TV announcers (CBS): Andrew Catalon, Steve Beuerlein and Steve Tasker
- Recap, Gamebook

Game information

**First quarter**

- TEN – Marcus Mariota 5-yard run (Ryan Succop kick), 0:23. Titans 7–0. **Drive: 5 plays, 61 yards, 2:49.**

**Second quarter**

- MIA – Jakeem Grant 74-yard punt return (Andrew Franks kick), 12:23. Tied 7–7.
- TEN – Andre Johnson 5-yard pass from Marcus Mariota (Ryan Succop kick), 5:30. Titans 14–7. **Drive: 12 plays, 76 yards, 6:53.**
- MIA – Jay Ajayi 4-yard run (Andrew Franks kick), 2:00. Tied 14–14. **Drive: 6 plays, 79 yards, 3:30.**
- TEN – Delanie Walker 20-yard pass from Marcus Mariota (Ryan Succop kick), 0:47. Titans 21–14. **Drive: 6 plays, 75 yards, 1:13.**

**Third quarter**

- TEN – Ryan Succop 40-yard field goal, 10:33. Titans 24–14. **Drive: 4 plays, 2 yards, 1:25.**
- MIA – Andrew Franks 24-yard field goal, 5:10. Titans 24–17. **Drive: 8 plays, 69 yards, 5:23.**

**Fourth quarter**

- TEN – Rishard Matthews 4-yard pass from Marcus Mariota (kick blocked), 8:23. Titans 30–17. **Drive: 9 plays, 66 yards, 4:54.**

**Top passers**

- TEN – Marcus Mariota – 20/29, 163 yards, 3 TD
- MIA – Ryan Tannehill – 12/18, 191 yards, 2 INT

**Top rushers**

- TEN – DeMarco Murray – 27 rushes, 121 yards
- MIA – Jay Ajayi – 13 rushes, 42 yards, TD

**Top receivers**

- TEN – Delanie Walker – 5 receptions, 66 yards, TD
- MIA – DeVante Parker – 2 receptions, 70 yards

==== Week 6: vs. Cleveland Browns ====
Week Six: Cleveland Browns at Tennessee Titans – Game summary

Quarter	1	2	3	4	Total
Browns	6	7	0	13	**26**
**Titans**	7	7	7	7	**28**

at Nissan Stadium, Nashville, Tennessee

- Date: October 16
- Game time: 12:00 p.m. CDT
- Game weather: 75 °F (24 °C), sunny
- Game attendance: 60,897
- Referee: Carl Cheffers
- TV announcers (CBS): Tom McCarthy and Adam Archuleta
- Recap, Gamebook

Game information

**First quarter**

- TEN – Rishard Matthews 11-yard pass from Marcus Mariota (Ryan Succop kick), 10:37. Titans 7–0. **Drive: 7 plays, 75 yards, 4:23.**
- CLE – Cody Parkey 45-yard field goal, 8:47. Titans 7–3. **Drive: 5 plays, 48 yards, 1:50.**
- CLE – Cody Parkey 37-yard field goal, 2:08. Titans 7–6. **Drive: 8 plays, 71 yards, 4:53.**

**Second quarter**

- TEN – Kendall Wright 48-yard pass from Marcus Mariota (Ryan Succop kick), 11:51. Titans 14–6. **Drive: 4 plays, 59 yards, 2:16.**
- CLE – Terrelle Pryor 7-yard pass from Cody Kessler (Cody Parkey kick), 0:14. Titans 14–13. **Drive: 9 plays, 94 yards, 3:49.**

**Third quarter**

- TEN – DeMarco Murray 3-yard run (Ryan Succop kick), 9:33. Titans 21–13. **Drive: 7 plays, 70 yards, 3:36.**

**Fourth quarter**

- TEN – Anthony Fasano 15-yard pass from Marcus Mariota (Ryan Succop kick), 6:43. Titans 28–13. **Drive: 12 plays, 80 yards, 6:59.**
- CLE – Terrelle Pryor 5-yard pass from Cody Kessler (pass failed), 2:07. Titans 28–19. **Drive: 13 plays, 75 yards, 4:36.**
- CLE – Duke Johnson 1-yard run (Cody Parkey kick), 0:27. Titans 28–26. **Drive: 9 plays, 62 yards, 1:40.**

**Top passers**

- CLE – Cody Kessler – 26/41, 336 yards, 2 TD
- TEN – Marcus Mariota – 17/24, 284 yards, 3 TD, INT

**Top rushers**

- CLE – Duke Johnson – 4 rushes, 18 yards, TD
- TEN – DeMarco Murray – 21 rushes, 65 yards, TD

**Top receivers**

- CLE – Terrelle Pryor – 9 receptions, 75 yards, 2 TD
- TEN – Kendall Wright – 8 receptions, 133 yards, TD

The Titans posted their first victory over their former AFC Central rival since 2011 and only their third win over the Browns since 2002 league realignment established the AFC South. Marcus Mariota threw three touchdowns but Cody Kessler kept the Browns in the hunt with two touchdown drives in the final three minutes.

==== Week 7: vs. Indianapolis Colts ====
Week Seven: Indianapolis Colts at Tennessee Titans – Game summary

Quarter	1	2	3	4	Total
**Colts**	7	10	3	14	**34**
Titans	6	7	0	13	**26**

at Nissan Stadium, Nashville, Tennessee

- Date: October 23
- Game time: 12:00 p.m. CDT
- Game weather: 68 °F (20 °C), sunny
- Game attendance: 65,470
- Referee: Jerome Boger
- TV announcers (CBS): Spero Dedes and Solomon Wilcots
- Recap, Gamebook

Game information

**First quarter**

- TEN – Taylor Lewan 10-yard pass from Marcus Mariota (pass failed), 9:14. Titans 6–0. **Drive: 10 plays, 78 yards, 5:46.**
- IND – Frank Gore 3-yard pass from Andrew Luck (Adam Vinatieri kick), 4:46. Colts 7–6. **Drive: 10 plays, 72 yards, 4:28.**

**Second quarter**

- IND – T. Y. Hilton 37-yard pass from Andrew Luck (Adam Vinatieri kick), 10:16. Colts 14–6. **Drive: 6 plays, 93 yards, 3:24.**
- IND – Adam Vinatieri 28-yard field goal, 7:06. Colts 17–6. **Drive: 6 plays, 25 yards, 3:10.**
- TEN – DeMarco Murray 1-yard run (Ryan Succop kick), 0:34. Colts 17–13. **Drive: 11 plays, 80 yards, 1:38.**

**Third quarter**

- IND – Adam Vinatieri 33-yard field goal, 3:46. Colts 20–13. **Drive: 11 plays, 73 yards, 6:04.**

**Fourth quarter**

- TEN – Delanie Walker 7-yard pass from Marcus Mariota (Ryan Succop kick), 12:39. Tied 20–20. **Drive: 13 plays, 75 yards, 6:07.**
- TEN – Ryan Succop 48-yard field goal, 6:02. Titans 23–20. **Drive: 7 plays, 50 yards, 3:39.**
- IND – Jack Doyle 7-yard pass from Andrew Luck (Adam Vinatieri kick), 1:55. Colts 27–23. **Drive: 12 plays, 70 yards, 4:07.**
- IND – Robert Mathis 14-yard fumble return (Adam Vinatieri kick), 1:47. Colts 34–23.
- TEN – Ryan Succop 44-yard field goal, 0:43. Colts 34–26. **Drive: 7 plays, 49 yards, 1:04.**

**Top passers**

- IND – Andrew Luck – 27/39, 353 yards, 3 TD
- TEN – Marcus Mariota – 22/37, 232 yards, 2 TD

**Top rushers**

- IND – Frank Gore – 17 rushes, 61 yards
- TEN – DeMarco Murray – 25 rushes, 107 yards, TD

**Top receivers**

- IND – T. Y. Hilton – 7 receptions, 133 yards, TD
- TEN – Delanie Walker – 7 receptions, 84 yards, TD

Taylor Lewan caught his first career touchdown.

==== Week 8: vs. Jacksonville Jaguars ====
Week Eight: Jacksonville Jaguars at Tennessee Titans – Game summary

Quarter	1	2	3	4	Total
Jaguars	0	0	8	14	**22**
**Titans**	3	24	6	3	**36**

at Nissan Stadium, Nashville, Tennessee

- Date: October 27
- Game time: 7:25 p.m. CDT
- Game weather: 71 °F (22 °C), clear
- Game attendance: 61,619
- Referee: John Hussey
- TV announcers (NFLN): Jim Nantz, Phil Simms and Tracy Wolfson
- Recap, Gamebook

Game information

**First quarter**

- TEN – Ryan Succop 32-yard field goal, 3:31. Titans 3–0. **Drive: 10 plays, 54 yards, 5:34.**

**Second quarter**

- TEN – Kendall Wright 36-yard pass from Marcus Mariota (Ryan Succop kick), 14:53. Titans 10–0. **Drive: 4 plays, 66 yards, 1:59.**
- TEN – Derrick Henry 6-yard run (Ryan Succop kick), 10:36. Titans 17–0. **Drive: 8 plays, 69 yards, 3:25.**
- TEN – DeMarco Murray 14-yard run (Ryan Succop kick), 7:09. Titans 24–0. **Drive: 4 plays, 62 yards, 1:43.**
- TEN – Ryan Succop 22-yard field goal, 0:00. Titans 27–0. **Drive: 12 plays, 90 yards, 3:13.**

**Third quarter**

- JAX – Julius Thomas 10-yard pass from Blake Bortles (Blake Bortles run), 11:05. Titans 27–8. **Drive: 11 plays, 75 yards, 3:55.**
- TEN – Rishard Matthews 4-yard pass from Marcus Mariota (kick failed, wide left), 6:53. Titans 33–8. **Drive: 7 plays, 75 yards, 4:12.**

**Fourth quarter**

- TEN – Ryan Succop 33-yard field goal, 12:32. Titans 36–8. **Drive: 9 plays, 20 yards, 5:10.**
- JAX – Allen Hurns 5-yard pass from Blake Bortles (Jason Myers kick), 3:11. Titans 36–15. **Drive: 7 plays, 58 yards, 2:08.**
- JAX – Bryan Walters 7-yard pass from Blake Bortles (Jason Myers kick), 0:01. Titans 36–22. **Drive: 12 plays, 91 yards, 2:32.**

**Top passers**

- JAX – Blake Bortles – 33/54, 337 yards, 3 TD
- TEN – Marcus Mariota – 18/22, 270 yards, 2 TD

**Top rushers**

- JAX – Blake Bortles – 4 rushes, 22 yards
- TEN – DeMarco Murray – 21 rushes, 123 yards, TD

**Top receivers**

- JAX – Allen Hurns – 7 receptions, 98 yards, TD
- TEN – Kendall Wright – 4 receptions, 84 yards, TD

With the win, the Titans improved on their 3–13 season from the previous year.

==== Week 9: at San Diego Chargers ====
Week Nine: Tennessee Titans at San Diego Chargers – Game summary

Quarter	1	2	3	4	Total
Titans	0	14	7	14	**35**
**Chargers**	9	10	14	10	**43**

at Qualcomm Stadium, San Diego, California

- Date: November 6
- Game time: 3:25 p.m. CST/1:25 p.m. PST
- Game weather: 76 °F (24 °C), partly cloudy
- Game attendance: 52,281
- Referee: Brad Allen
- TV announcers (CBS): Kevin Harlan, Dan Fouts and Scott Kaplan
- Recap, Gamebook

Game information

**First quarter**

- SD – Antonio Gates 13-yard pass from Philip Rivers (kick failed, wide right), 10:02. Chargers 6–0. **Drive: 9 plays, 75 yards, 4:58.**
- SD – Josh Lambo 32-yard field goal, 4:11. Chargers 9–0. **Drive: 10 plays, 35 yards, 4:44.**

**Second quarter**

- SD – Tyrell Williams 6-yard pass from Philip Rivers (Josh Lambo kick), 14:18. Chargers 16–0. **Drive: 5 plays, 87 yards, 2:51.**
- TEN – Rishard Matthews 16-yard pass from Marcus Mariota (Ryan Succop kick), 11:14. Chargers 16–7. **Drive: 8 plays, 75 yards, 3:04.**
- SD – Josh Lambo 23-yard field goal, 1:32. Chargers 19–7. **Drive: 6 plays, 10 yards, 0:52.**
- TEN – Rishard Matthews 7-yard pass from Marcus Mariota (Ryan Succop kick), 0:14. Chargers 19–14. **Drive: 7 plays, 75 yards, 1:18.**

**Third quarter**

- TEN – Marcus Mariota 14-yard run (Ryan Succop kick), 12:19. Titans 21–19. **Drive: 9 plays, 75 yards, 2:41.**
- SD – Melvin Gordon 1-yard run (Josh Lambo kick), 5:28. Chargers 26–21. **Drive: 14 plays, 75 yards, 6:51.**
- SD – Dwight Lowery 36-yard fumble return (Josh Lambo kick), 2:31. Chargers 33–21.

**Fourth quarter**

- TEN – Delanie Walker 8-yard pass from Marcus Mariota (Ryan Succop kick), 9:51. Chargers 33–28. **Drive: 7 plays, 80 yards, 2:59.**
- SD – Josh Lambo 36-yard field goal, 6:05. Chargers 36–28. **Drive: 7 plays, 57 yards, 3:46.**
- SD – Brandon Flowers 33-yard interception return (Josh Lambo kick), 4:51. Chargers 43–28.
- TEN – DeMarco Murray 1-yard run (Ryan Succop kick), 2:45. Chargers 43–35. **Drive: 10 plays, 75 yards, 2:06.**

**Top passers**

- TEN – Marcus Mariota – 27/43, 313 yards, 3 TD, 2 INT
- SD – Philip Rivers – 24/33, 275 yards, 2 TD

**Top rushers**

- TEN – DeMarco Murray – 14 rushes, 51 yards, TD
- SD – Melvin Gordon – 32 rushes, 196 yards, TD

**Top receivers**

- TEN – Rishard Matthews – 6 receptions, 63 yards, 2 TD
- SD – Antonio Gates – 5 receptions, 75 yards, TD

==== Week 10: vs. Green Bay Packers ====
Week Ten: Green Bay Packers at Tennessee Titans – Game summary

Quarter	1	2	3	4	Total
Packers	0	16	9	0	**25**
**Titans**	21	14	6	6	**47**

at Nissan Stadium, Nashville, Tennessee

- Date: November 13
- Game time: 12:00 p.m. CST
- Game weather: 56 °F (13 °C), sunny
- Game attendance: 69,116
- Referee: Jeff Triplette
- TV announcers (Fox): Kenny Albert, Daryl Johnston and Laura Okmin
- Recap, Gamebook

Game information

**First quarter**

- TEN – DeMarco Murray 75-yard run (Ryan Succop kick), 13:17. Titans 7–0. **Drive: 1 play, 80 yards, 0:11.**
- TEN – Delanie Walker 10-yard pass from DeMarco Murray (Ryan Succop kick), 6:58. Titans 14–0. **Drive: 7 plays, 85 yards, 3:26.**
- TEN – Anthony Fasano 9-yard pass from Marcus Mariota (Ryan Succop kick), 0:08. Titans 21–0. **Drive: 9 plays, 71 yards, 5:17.**

**Second quarter**

- GB – Jordy Nelson 1-yard pass from Aaron Rodgers (Mason Crosby kick), 10:49. Titans 21–7. **Drive: 9 plays, 75 yards, 4:19.**
- TEN – Rishard Matthews 32-yard pass from Marcus Mariota (Ryan Succop kick), 8:45. Titans 28–7. **Drive: 4 plays, 75 yards, 2:04.**
- GB – Mason Crosby 29-yard field goal, 3:55. Titans 28–10. **Drive: 8 plays, 64 yards, 4:50.**
- TEN – Kendall Wright 6-yard pass from Marcus Mariota (Ryan Succop kick), 1:55. Titans 35–10. **Drive: 3 plays, 12 yards, 0:27.**
- GB – James Starks 13-yard pass from Aaron Rodgers (kick failed, wide left), 0:43. Titans 35–16. **Drive: 6 plays, 75 yards, 1:12.**

**Third quarter**

- GB – Aaron Rodgers 20-yard run (run failed), 8:53. Titans 35–22. **Drive: 10 plays, 78 yards, 4:12.**
- TEN – Tajae Sharpe 33-yard pass from Marcus Mariota (pass failed), 6:27. Titans 41–22. **Drive: 5 plays, 55 yards, 2:26.**
- GB – Mason Crosby 38-yard field goal, 0:57. Titans 41–25. **Drive: 11 plays, 46 yards, 5:30.**

**Fourth quarter**

- TEN – Ryan Succop 51-yard field goal, 9:56. Titans 44–25. **Drive: 5 plays, 26 yards, 2:04.**
- TEN – Ryan Succop 23-yard field goal, 4:52. Titans 47–25. **Drive: 9 plays, 44 yards, 4:03.**

**Top passers**

- GB – Aaron Rodgers – 31/51, 371 yards, 2 TD, 2 INT
- TEN – Marcus Mariota – 19/26, 295 yards, 4 TD

**Top rushers**

- GB – James Starks – 7 rushes, 33 yards
- TEN – DeMarco Murray – 17 rushes, 123 yards, TD

**Top receivers**

- GB – Jordy Nelson – 12 receptions, 126 yards, TD
- TEN – Delanie Walker – 9 receptions, 124 yards, TD

The Titans defeated the Packers for the fourth time in six meetings since becoming a Tennessee NFL franchise. The Titans raced to a 21–0 lead in the first quarter and led 35–16 at halftime. Rookie Tajae Sharpe caught his first career touchdown.

==== Week 11: at Indianapolis Colts ====
Week Eleven: Tennessee Titans at Indianapolis Colts – Game summary

Quarter	1	2	3	4	Total
Titans	0	7	7	3	**17**
**Colts**	14	7	0	3	**24**

at Lucas Oil Stadium, Indianapolis, Indiana

- Date: November 20
- Game time: 1:00 p.m. EST/12:00 p.m. CST
- Game weather: Played indoors (retractable roof closed)
- Game attendance: 65,048
- Referee: Walt Anderson
- TV announcers (CBS): Spero Dedes and Solomon Wilcots
- Recap, Gamebook

Game information

**First quarter**

- IND – Robert Turbin 1-yard run (Adam Vinatieri kick), 8:39. Colts 7–0. **Drive: 8 plays, 64 yards, 4:59.**
- IND – Donte Moncrief 2-yard pass from Andrew Luck (Adam Vinatieri kick), 2:32. Colts 14–0. **Drive: 7 plays, 75 yards, 3:55.**

**Second quarter**

- IND – T. Y. Hilton 2-yard pass from Andrew Luck (Adam Vinatieri kick), 10:35. Colts 21–0. **Drive: 9 plays, 80 yards, 4:48.**
- TEN – DeMarco Murray 3-yard pass from Marcus Mariota (Ryan Succop kick), 0:20. Colts 21–7. **Drive: 12 plays, 68 yards, 1:53.**

**Third quarter**

- TEN – Tajae Sharpe 34-yard pass from Marcus Mariota (Ryan Succop kick), 6:35. Colts 21–14. **Drive: 9 plays, 98 yards, 4:50.**

**Fourth quarter**

- TEN – Ryan Succop 47-yard field goal, 12:14. Colts 21–17. **Drive: 11 plays, 65 yards, 5:53.**
- IND – Adam Vinatieri 49-yard field goal, 10:50. Colts 24–17. **Drive: 5 plays, 44 yards, 1:24.**

**Top passers**

- TEN – Marcus Mariota – 25/38, 290 yards, 2 TD
- IND – Andrew Luck – 15/28, 262 yards, 2 TD, INT

**Top rushers**

- TEN – DeMarco Murray – 21 rushes, 70 yards
- IND – Frank Gore – 18 rushes, 50 yards

**Top receivers**

- TEN – Rishard Matthews – 9 receptions, 122 yards
- IND – T. Y. Hilton – 5 receptions, 97 yards, TD

==== Week 12: at Chicago Bears ====
Week Twelve: Tennessee Titans at Chicago Bears – Game summary

Quarter	1	2	3	4	Total
**Titans**	7	14	3	3	**27**
Bears	7	0	0	14	**21**

at Soldier Field, Chicago, Illinois

- Date: November 27
- Game time: 12:00 p.m. CST
- Game weather: 40 °F (4 °C), cloudy
- Game attendance: 59,494
- Referee: Ed Hochuli
- TV announcers (CBS): Spero Dedes and Solomon Wilcots
- Recap, Gamebook

Game information

**First quarter**

- CHI – Daniel Brown 7-yard pass from Matt Barkley (Connor Barth kick), 4:27. Bears 7–0. **Drive: 13 plays, 84 yards, 5:47.**
- TEN – Derrick Henry 11-yard run (Ryan Succop kick), 0:04. Tied 7–7. **Drive: 7 plays, 75 yards, 4:23.**

**Second quarter**

- TEN – Delanie Walker 4-yard pass from Marcus Mariota (Ryan Succop kick), 9:11. Titans 14–7. **Drive: 8 plays, 64 yards, 5:00.**
- TEN – Rishard Matthews 29-yard pass from Marcus Mariota (Ryan Succop kick), 1:15. Titans 21–7. **Drive: 5 plays, 65 yards, 1:00.**

**Third quarter**

- TEN – Ryan Succop 19-yard field goal, 4:07. Titans 24–7. **Drive: 11 plays, 79 yards, 6:29.**

**Fourth quarter**

- TEN – Ryan Succop 31-yard field goal, 13:45. Titans 27–7. **Drive: 7 plays, 35 yards, 3:13.**
- CHI – Marquess Wilson 8-yard pass from Matt Barkley (Connor Barth kick), 8:23. Titans 27–14. **Drive: 14 plays, 75 yards, 5:22.**
- CHI – Deonte Thompson 6-yard pass from Matt Barkley (Connor Barth kick), 3:06. Titans 27–21. **Drive: 13 plays, 69 yards, 3:29.**

**Top passers**

- TEN – Marcus Mariota – 15/23, 226 yards, 2 TD
- CHI – Matt Barkley – 28/54, 316 yards, 3 TD, 2 INT

**Top rushers**

- TEN – Derrick Henry – 8 rushes, 60 yards, TD
- CHI – Jordan Howard – 18 rushes, 84 yards

**Top receivers**

- TEN – Richard Matthews – 3 receptions, 64 yards, TD
- CHI – Marquess Wilson – 8 receptions, 124 yards, TD

The Titans posted their sixth win of the season as Marcus Mariota faced off against Matt Barkley, in his first NFL action since 2014; he opened scoring late in the first quarter on a seven-yard toss. Mariota answered with three straight touchdown drives, but Barkley answered a Titans lead of 27–7 with two straight touchdown drives and whipped to the Titans red zone in the final minute, but two incompletions ended the game.

==== Week 14: vs. Denver Broncos ====
Week Fourteen: Denver Broncos at Tennessee Titans – Game summary

Quarter	1	2	3	4	Total
Broncos	0	0	0	10	**10**
**Titans**	10	3	0	0	**13**

at Nissan Stadium, Nashville, Tennessee

- Date: December 11
- Game time: 12:00 p.m. CST
- Game weather: 50 °F (10 °C), sunny
- Game attendance: 68,780
- Referee: John Parry
- TV announcers (CBS): Ian Eagle, Dan Fouts and Evan Washburn
- Recap, Gamebook

Game information

**First quarter**

- TEN – DeMarco Murray 1-yard run (Ryan Succop kick), 7:29. Titans 7–0. **Drive: 11 plays, 70 yards, 6:06.**
- TEN – Ryan Succop 53-yard field goal, 5:48. Titans 10–0. **Drive: 4 plays, 5 yards, 1:00.**

**Second quarter**

- TEN – Ryan Succop 41-yard field goal, 1:27. Titans 13–0. **Drive: 19 plays, 74 yards, 8:04.**

**Third quarter**

- No scoring plays

**Fourth quarter**

- DEN – Emmanuel Sanders 3-yard pass from Trevor Siemian (Brandon McManus kick), 9:58. Titans 13–7. **Drive: 5 plays, 26 yards, 2:36.**
- DEN – Brandon McManus 34-yard field goal, 4:28. Titans 13–10. **Drive: 11 plays, 39 yards, 4:27.**

**Top passers**

- DEN – Trevor Siemian – 35/51, 334 yards, TD
- TEN – Marcus Mariota – 6/20, 88 yards

**Top rushers**

- DEN – Justin Forsett – 6 rushes, 17 yards
- TEN – DeMarco Murray – 21 rushes, 92 yards, TD

**Top receivers**

- DEN – Emmanuel Sanders – 11 receptions, 100 yards, TD
- TEN – Delanie Walker – 2 receptions, 30 yards

The Titans posted only their second win (in six tries) over the Broncos since becoming a Tennessee NFL franchise. They led 13–0 but had to sweat out a Broncos rally; A.J. Derby's fumble was recovered by Daimion Stafford with 1:04 to go. The game became chippy when Harry Douglas cut block Chris Harris, Jr. in the second quarter; Aqib Talib attacked Douglas and a melee erupted on the Titans sideline.

The victory was the 425th in the franchise's history.

==== Week 15: at Kansas City Chiefs ====
Week Fifteen: Tennessee Titans at Kansas City Chiefs – Game summary

Quarter	1	2	3	4	Total
**Titans**	0	7	0	12	**19**
Chiefs	14	3	0	0	**17**

at Arrowhead Stadium, Kansas City, Missouri

- Date: December 18
- Game time: 12:00 p.m. CST
- Game weather: 1 °F (−17 °C), sunny
- Game attendance: 68,084
- Referee: John Hussey
- TV announcers (CBS): Greg Gumbel, Trent Green and Jamie Erdahl
- Recap, Gamebook

Game information

**First quarter**

- KC – Tyreek Hill 68-yard run (Cairo Santos kick), 11:43. Chiefs 7–0. **Drive: 2 plays, 74 yards, 0:51.**
- KC – Alex Smith 10-yard run (Cairo Santos kick), 4:24. Chiefs 14–0. **Drive: 4 plays, 53 yards, 2:20.**

**Second quarter**

- TEN – Derrick Henry 4-yard run (Ryan Succop kick), 11:58. Chiefs 14–7. **Drive: 6 plays, 87 yards, 3:33.**
- KC – Cairo Santos 34-yard field goal, 0:13. Chiefs 17–7. **Drive: 8 plays, 29 yards, 1:29.**

**Third quarter**

- No scoring plays

**Fourth quarter**

- TEN – Ryan Succop 39-yard field goal, 11:54. Chiefs 17–10. **Drive: 11 plays, 51 yards, 3:26.**
- TEN – Derrick Henry 1-yard run (pass failed), 3:12. Chiefs 17–16. **Drive: 12 plays, 88 yards, 4:42.**
- TEN – Ryan Succop 53-yard field goal (6-40, 1:07), 0:00. Titans 19–17. **Drive: 6 plays, 40 yards, 1:07.**

**Top passers**

- TEN – Marcus Mariota – 19/33, 241 yards, INT
- KC – Alex Smith – 15/28, 163 yards, INT

**Top rushers**

- TEN – DeMarco Murray – 18 rushes, 89 yards
- KC – Spencer Ware – 18 rushes, 70 yards

**Top receivers**

- TEN – Rishard Matthews – 4 receptions, 105 yards
- KC – Jeremy Maclin – 6 receptions, 82 yards

The Titans edged the Chiefs on a 53-yard field goal on the final play by former Chiefs placekicker Ryan Succop; he missed a first attempt but the attempt was nullified when Chiefs coach Andy Reid called timeout.

==== Week 16: at Jacksonville Jaguars ====
Week Sixteen: Tennessee Titans at Jacksonville Jaguars – Game summary

Quarter	1	2	3	4	Total
Titans	0	7	3	7	**17**
**Jaguars**	10	9	6	13	**38**

at EverBank Field, Jacksonville, Florida

- Date: December 24
- Game time: 12:00 p.m. CST
- Game weather: 67 °F (19 °C), clear
- Game attendance: 59,621
- Referee: Pete Morelli
- TV announcers (CBS): Andrew Catalon, Steve Beuerlein and Steve Tasker
- Recap, Gamebook

Game information

**First quarter**

- JAX – Marqise Lee 21-yard pass from Blake Bortles (Jason Myers kick), 11:03. Jaguars 7–0. **Drive: 8 plays, 75 yards, 3:57.**
- JAX – Jason Myers 29-yard field goal, 4:03. Jaguars 10–0. **Drive: 11 plays, 63 yards, 5:30.**

**Second quarter**

- TEN – Rishard Matthews 3-yard pass from Marcus Mariota (Ryan Succop kick), 8:59. Jaguars 10–7. **Drive: 10 plays, 69 yards, 6:01.**
- JAX – Chris Ivory 1-yard run (kick failed, wr), 1:57. Jaguars 16–7. **Drive: 12 plays, 75 yards, 7:02.**
- JAX – Jason Myers 48-yard field goal, 0:11. Jaguars 19–7. **Drive: 8 plays, 48 yards, 0:58.**

**Third quarter**

- TEN – Ryan Succop 42-yard field goal, 12:24. Jaguars 19–10. **Drive: 4 plays, 2 yards, 0:59.**
- JAX – Jason Myers 56-yard field goal, 8:13. Jaguars 22–10. **Drive: 10 plays, 37 yards, 4:11.**
- JAX – Jason Myers 50-yard field goal, 2:59. Jaguars 25–10. **Drive: 7 plays, 45 yards, 3:02.**

**Fourth quarter**

- TEN – Delanie Walker 14-yard pass from Matt Cassel (Ryan Succop kick), 8:42. Jaguars 25–17. **Drive: 8 plays, 50 yards, 5:24.**
- JAX – Blake Bortles 20-yard pass from Marqise Lee (kick failed, wide left), 5:25. Jaguars 31–17. **Drive: 6 plays, 75 yards, 3:17.**
- JAX – Jalen Ramsey 30-yard interception return (Jason Myers kick), 5:17. Jaguars 38–17.

**Top passers**

- JAX – Blake Bortles – 26/38, 325 yards, TD
- TEN – Matt Cassel – 13/24, 124 yards, TD, INT

**Top rushers**

- JAX – Chris Ivory – 14 rushes, 45 yards, TD
- TEN – DeMarco Murray – 14 rushes, 42 yards

**Top receivers**

- JAX – Allen Robinson – 9 receptions, 147 yards
- TEN – Harry Douglas – 5 receptions, 48 yards

Marcus Mariota's season ended when he suffered a broken right fibula in Tennessee's 38–17 loss to the Jaguars; the loss marked the eighth straight season in which neither team managed to sweep the other in the regular season. The loss—combined with Houston's subsequent win over Cincinnati—ended Tennessee's hopes for the playoffs.

==== Week 17: vs. Houston Texans ====
Week Seventeen: Houston Texans at Tennessee Titans – Game summary

Quarter	1	2	3	4	Total
Texans	0	0	10	7	**17**
**Titans**	7	7	7	3	**24**

at Nissan Stadium, Nashville, Tennessee

- Date: January 1, 2017
- Game time: 12:00 p.m. CST
- Game weather: 52 °F (11 °C), cloudy
- Game attendance: 65,205
- Referee: Bill Vinovich
- TV announcers (CBS): Tom McCarthy and Adam Archuletta
- Recap, Gamebook

Game information

**First quarter**

- TEN – DaQuan Jones fumble recovery in the end zone (Ryan Succop kick), 9:57. Titans 7–0.

**Second quarter**

- TEN – Rishard Matthews 2-yard pass from Matt Cassel (Ryan Succop kick), 0:23. Titans 14–0. **Drive: 7 plays, 36 yards, 2:08.**

**Third quarter**

- HOU – C. J. Fiedorowicz 4-yard pass from Brock Osweiler (Nick Novak kick), 10:31. Titans 14–7. **Drive: 13 plays, 81 yards, 4:29.**
- TEN – Derrick Henry 2-yard run (Ryan Succop kick), 4:44. Titans 21–7. **Drive: 10 plays, 55 yards, 5:47.**
- HOU – Nick Novak 26-yard field goal, 1:15. Titans 21–10. **Drive: 8 plays, 67 yards, 3:33.**

**Fourth quarter**

- TEN – Ryan Succop 35-yard field goal, 8:34. Titans 24–10. **Drive: 13 plays, 57 yards, 7:41.**
- HOU – Brock Osweiler 1-yard run (Nick Novak kick), 3:11. Titans 24–17. **Drive: 14 plays, 75 yards, 5:19.**

**Top passers**

- HOU – Brock Osweiler – 21/40, 253 yards, TD
- TEN – Matt Cassel – 16/26, 150 yards, TD, INT

**Top rushers**

- HOU – Alfred Blue – 11 rushes, 28 yards
- TEN – Derrick Henry – 15 rushes, 65 yards, TD

**Top receivers**

- HOU – DeAndre Hopkins – 7 receptions, 123 yards
- TEN – Rishard Matthews – 9 receptions, 114 yards, TD

The win was the Titans' first against the Texans since 2013.

NOTE: With the win, the Titans posted 9 wins and a winning season for the first time since 2011.

== Standings ==
=== Division ===
AFC South
	W	L	T	PCT	DIV	CONF	PF	PA	STK
^{(4)} Houston Texans	9	7	0	.563	5–1	7–5	279	328	L1
Tennessee Titans	9	7	0	.563	2–4	6–6	381	378	W1
Indianapolis Colts	8	8	0	.500	3–3	5–7	411	392	W1
Jacksonville Jaguars	3	13	0	.188	2–4	2–10	318	400	L1

=== Conference ===
AFC
#	Team	Division	W	L	T	PCT	DIV	CONF	SOS	SOV	STK
Division leaders
1	New England Patriots	East	14	2	0	.875	5–1	11–1	.439	.424	W7
2 (Note: Kansas City clinched the AFC West division over Oakland based on head-to-head sweep.)	Kansas City Chiefs	West	12	4	0	.750	6–0	9–3	.508	.479	W2
3	Pittsburgh Steelers	North	11	5	0	.688	5–1	9–3	.494	.423	W7
4 (Note: Houston clinched the AFC South division title over Tennessee based on record vs. division opponents.)	Houston Texans	South	9	7	0	.563	5–1	7–5	.502	.427	L1
Wild Cards
5	Oakland Raiders	West	12	4	0	.750	3–3	9–3	.504	.443	L1
6	Miami Dolphins	East	10	6	0	.625	4–2	7–5	.455	.341	L1
Did not qualify for the postseason
7 (Note: Tennessee finished ahead of Denver based on head-to-head victory.)	Tennessee Titans	South	9	7	0	.563	2–4	6–6	.465	.458	W1
8	Denver Broncos	West	9	7	0	.563	2–4	6–6	.549	.455	W1
9 (Note: Baltimore finished ahead of Indianapolis based on record vs. conference opponents.)	Baltimore Ravens	North	8	8	0	.500	4–2	7–5	.498	.363	L2
10	Indianapolis Colts	South	8	8	0	.500	3–3	5–7	.492	.406	W1
11	Buffalo Bills	East	7	9	0	.438	1–5	4–8	.482	.339	L2
12	Cincinnati Bengals	North	6	9	1	.406	3–3	5–7	.521	.333	W1
13 (Note: The New York Jets finished ahead of San Diego based record vs. common opponents — the Jets' cumulative record against Cleveland, Indianapolis, Kansas City and Miami was 1–4, while San Diego's cumulative record against the same four teams was 0–5.)	New York Jets	East	5	11	0	.313	2–4	4–8	.518	.313	W1
14	San Diego Chargers	West	5	11	0	.313	1–5	4–8	.543	.513	L5
15	Jacksonville Jaguars	South	3	13	0	.188	2–4	2–10	.527	.417	L1
16	Cleveland Browns	North	1	15	0	.063	0–6	1–11	.549	.313	L1
Tiebreakers (Note: When breaking ties for three or more teams under the NFL's rules, they are first broken within divisions, then comparing only the highest ranked remaining team from each division.)
