= LeShaun Sims =

American football player (born 1993)

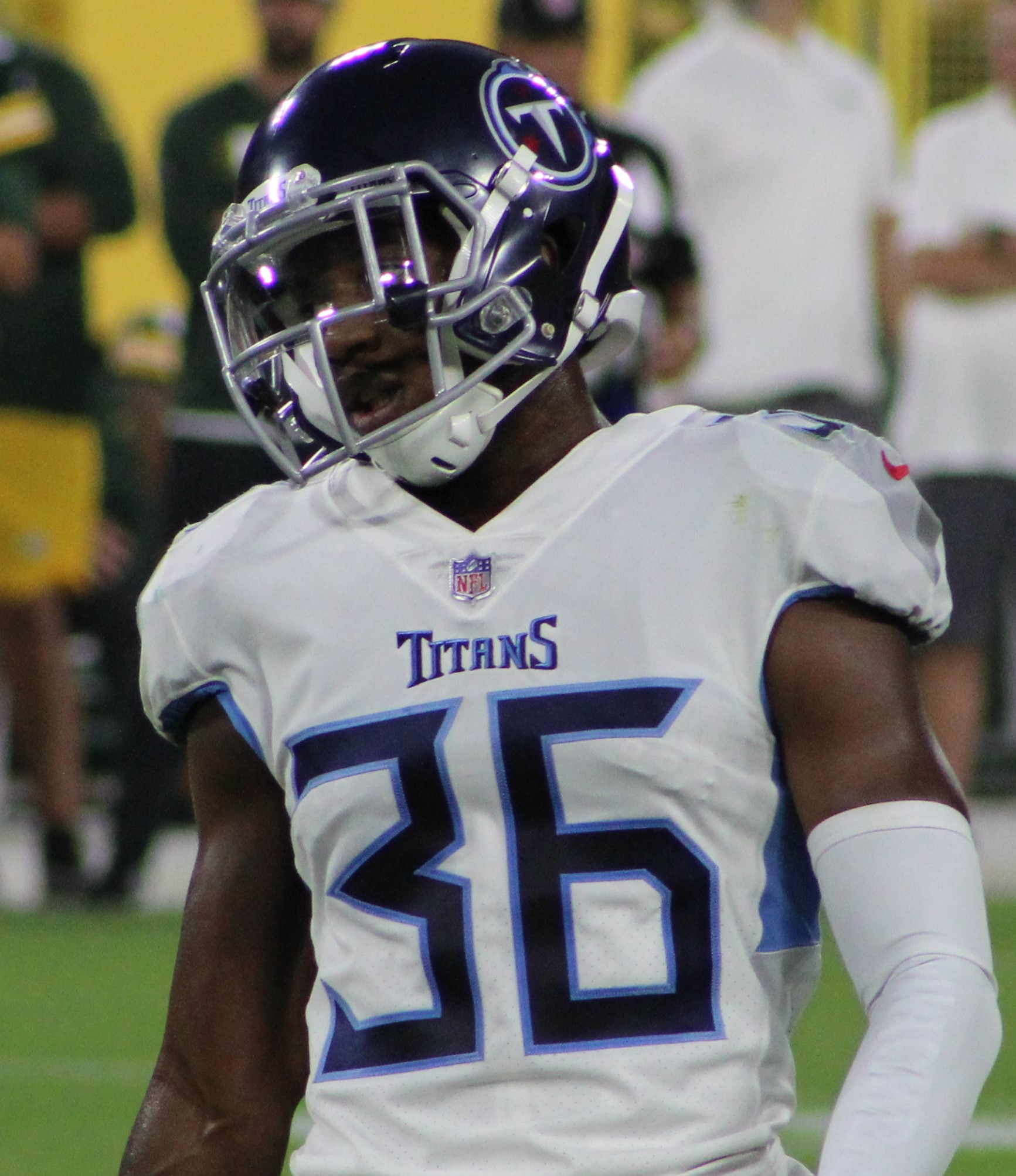
- Sims with the Tennessee Titans in 2018

No. 36, 38
- Position: Cornerback

Personal information
- Born: September 18, 1993 (age 33); Las Vegas, Nevada, U.S.
- Listed height: 6 ft 0 in (1.83 m)
- Listed weight: 203 lb (92 kg)

Career information
- High school: Andre Agassi Prep (Las Vegas)
- College: Southern Utah
- NFL draft: 2016: 5th round, 157th overall pick

Career history
- Tennessee Titans (2016–2019); Cincinnati Bengals (2020)

Awards and highlights
- First-team All-Big Sky (2015)

Career NFL statistics
- Total tackles: 167
- Forced fumbles: 1
- Fumble recoveries: 3
- Pass deflections: 12
- Interceptions: 3
- Stats at Pro Football Reference

LeShaun V. Sims (born September 18, 1993) is an American former professional football player who was a cornerback in the National Football League (NFL) for five seasons. He played college football for the Southern Utah Thunderbirds and was selected by the Tennessee Titans in the fifth round of the 2016 NFL draft. Sims also played for the Cincinnati Bengals.

== Early life ==
Sims was born in Las Vegas, Nevada on September 18, 1993, to Levell and Vonda Sims. He attended Andre Agassi College Preparatory Academy in Las Vegas, where he earned second-team all-state honors as a wide receiver and defensive back. As a senior, Sims tallied 52 tackles and a team-leading six interceptions on defense. On offense, he produced more than 400 receiving yards and five receiving touchdowns while rushing for 170 yards and another score.

Prior to Sims, no prior student-athlete from Andre Agassi Prep had ever earned an athletic scholarship. When he was a high school freshman, the Stars played eight-man football in the public charter school’s first year with a football team. They moved to 11-man football during his sophomore year, and by his senior season, the team won a league title.

== College career ==
Sims played college football at Southern Utah University. In four seasons at Southern Utah, he appeared in 47 total games with 46 starts, including starts in every game during his final three seasons. Sims' career totals included 220 tackles, eight interceptions, 27 pass deflections, a forced fumble, five fumble recoveries, and four tackles for loss.

Sims graduated in April 2016 with a degree in exercise science.

== Professional career ==
=== Pre-draft ===
Pre-draft measurables
Height	Weight	Arm length	Hand span	40-yard dash	10-yard split	20-yard split	20-yard shuttle	Three-cone drill	Vertical jump	Broad jump	Bench press
6 ft 0 1/2 in (1.84 m)	203 lb (92 kg)	31 5/8 in (0.80 m)	8 1/8 in (0.21 m)	4.53 s	1.64 s	2.68 s	4.19 s	6.84 s	37.0 in (0.94 m)	10 ft 7 in (3.23 m)	11 reps
All values from NFL Combine/Southern Utah's Pro Day

=== Tennessee Titans ===
==== 2016 season ====
Sims was selected by the Tennessee Titans in the fifth round (157th overall) in the 2016 NFL draft. On May 9, 2016, he signed a four-year contract with the Titans.

Sims made his NFL debut in Week 4 against the Houston Texans and finished the 27–20 road loss with a solo tackle. During a Week 8 36–22 victory over the Jacksonville Jaguars on Thursday Night Football, Sims recorded a tackle and a fumble recovery. Two weeks later against the Green Bay Packers, he had two solo tackles and a fumble recovery in the 47–25 victory.

During a Week 12 27–21 road victory over the Chicago Bears, Sims recorded a season-high five solo tackles. Following a Week 13 bye, the Titans returned home to face the Denver Broncos. In that game, he tied his season-high of five solo tackles and also had two pass deflections during the 13–10 victory. The following week against the Kansas City Chiefs, Sims recorded a pass deflection and his first NFL interception in the narrow 19–17 road victory. Pro Football Focus rated Sims the highest game grade of that game.

Sims finished his rookie year with 22 combined tackles (19 solo), three pass deflections, two fumble recoveries, and an interception in 13 games and two starts.

==== 2017 season ====
Sims entered the 2017 season as one of the starting cornerbacks for the Titans as the team's third cornerback behind rookie Adoree' Jackson and offseason acquisition Logan Ryan.

During Week 2 against the Jaguars, Sims recorded three combined tackles (two solo), a pass deflection, and a forced fumble in the 37–16 road victory. In the next game against the Seattle Seahawks, he had a solo tackle and a pass deflection during the 33–27 victory. The following week against the Texans, Sims recorded a season-high five combined tackles (four solo) in the 57–14 road loss.

During a Week 11 40–17 road loss to the Pittsburgh Steelers on Thursday Night Football, Sims had two combined tackles (one solo) and a pass deflection. Two weeks later against the Texans, he recorded two combined tackles (one solo), a pass deflection, and an interception. His interception came late in the fourth quarter and sealed the 24–13 victory for the Titans. During Week 15 against the San Francisco 49ers, Sims had a season-high five solo tackles in the narrow 25–23 road loss. On December 22, 2017, Sims was placed on injured reserve after suffering a hamstring injury in practice two days prior.

Sims finished his second professional season with a then career-high 36 combined tackles (31 solo), three pass deflections, a forced fumble, and an interception in 13 games and five starts.

==== 2018 season ====
Sims was demoted to a backup role after the Titans signed Malcolm Butler. Despite this, Sims recorded 22 combined tackles (15 solo) and played in all 16 games for the first time in his career and started in two of them after starting cornerback Logan Ryan suffered a season-ending leg injury during a Week 15 17–0 shutout road victory over the New York Giants.

==== 2019 season ====
For the first half of the season, Sims' role was similar to that of the previous season, yet he recorded a fumble recovery during a Week 5 14–7 loss to the Buffalo Bills and four combined tackles (two solo) and a pass deflection three weeks later in a 27–23 victory over the Tampa Bay Buccaneers.

During a Week 9 30–20 road loss to the Carolina Panthers, starting cornerback Malcolm Butler suffered a season-ending wrist injury, putting Sims in line to be a starter. Sims made his first start of the season the following week against the Chiefs and finished the 35–32 victory with a career-high 12 combined tackles (nine solo). Following a Week 11 bye, the Titans faced the Jaguars. In that game, Sims recorded six combined tackles (four solo) before leaving the eventual 42–20 victory with an ankle injury, causing him to miss the next two games. The Titans signed Tramaine Brock to fill in for Sims prior to the Week 14 matchup against the Oakland Raiders, and Sims returned to a backup role after he recovered.

Sims returned from his injury in time for the Week 15 matchup against the Texans and finished the 24–21 loss with four combined tackles (three solo) and also returned a punt for 11 yards. In the next game against the New Orleans Saints, Sims had six combined tackles (five solo) and a pass deflection during the 38–28 loss.

Sims finished the 2019 season with 35 combined tackles (24 solo), two pass deflections, and a fumble recovery in 14 games and two starts. The Titans finished the season with a 9–7 record and qualified for the playoffs as the #6-seed. In the Divisional Round against the Baltimore Ravens, Sims recorded two combined tackles (one solo) during the 28–12 road victory. During the AFC Championship Game against the Chiefs, he had two solo tackles in the 35–24 road loss.

=== Cincinnati Bengals ===
On March 31, 2020, Sims signed with the Cincinnati Bengals.

During a Week 3 23–23 tie against the Philadelphia Eagles, Sims made his Bengals debut and recorded two solo tackles, a pass deflection, and an interception. In the next game against the Jaguars, he had a season-high eight combined tackles (six solo) and a pass deflection during the 33–25 victory. The following week against the Ravens, Sims recorded two solo tackles and a pass deflection in the 27–3 road loss.

During Week 8 against his former team, the Tennessee Titans, Sims recorded six solo tackles in the 31–20 victory. During a Week 13 19–7 road loss to the Miami Dolphins, he tied his season-high of eight combined tackles (four solo). In the regular-season finale against the Ravens, Sims had four combined tackles (three solo) and a pass deflection during the 38–3 loss.

Sims finished the 2020 season with a career-high 52 combined tackles (38 solo), four pass deflections, and an interception in 13 games and 10 starts.

== NFL career statistics ==
=== Regular season ===
Year	Team	Games		Tackles				Interceptions						Fumbles	
Year	Team	GP	GS	Comb	Total	Ast	Sack	PD	Int	Yds	Avg	Lng	TD	FF	FR
2016	TEN	13	2	22	19	3	0.0	3	1	0	0.0	0	0	0	2
2017	TEN	13	5	36	31	5	0.0	3	1	0	0.0	0	0	1	0
2018	TEN	16	2	22	15	7	0.0	0	0	0	0.0	0	0	0	0
2019	TEN	14	2	35	24	11	0.0	2	0	0	0.0	0	0	0	1
2020	CIN	13	10	52	38	14	0.0	4	1	0	0.0	0	0	0	0
Career		69	21	167	127	40	0.0	12	3	0	0.0	0	0	1	3

=== Postseason ===
Year	Team	Games		Tackles				Interceptions						Fumbles	
Year	Team	GP	GS	Comb	Total	Ast	Sack	PD	Int	Yds	Avg	Lng	TD	FF	FR
2017	TEN	0	0	Did not play due to injury											
2019	TEN	3	0	4	3	1	0.0	0	0	0	0.0	0	0	0	0
Career		3	0	4	3	1	0.0	0	0	0	0.0	0	0	0	0

== Personal life ==
Sims is a movie buff who lists Training Day among his all-time favorites. Sims was commonly referred to as "Swis" in college because the name on the back of his jersey was upside down for his first college game. The nickname stuck.
