= 2020 Cincinnati Bengals season =

53rd season in franchise history

- Owner: Mike Brown
- Head coach: Zac Taylor
- Home stadium: Paul Brown Stadium

Results
- Record: 4–11–1
- Division place: 4th AFC North
- Playoffs: Did not qualify
- Pro Bowlers: None

Uniform
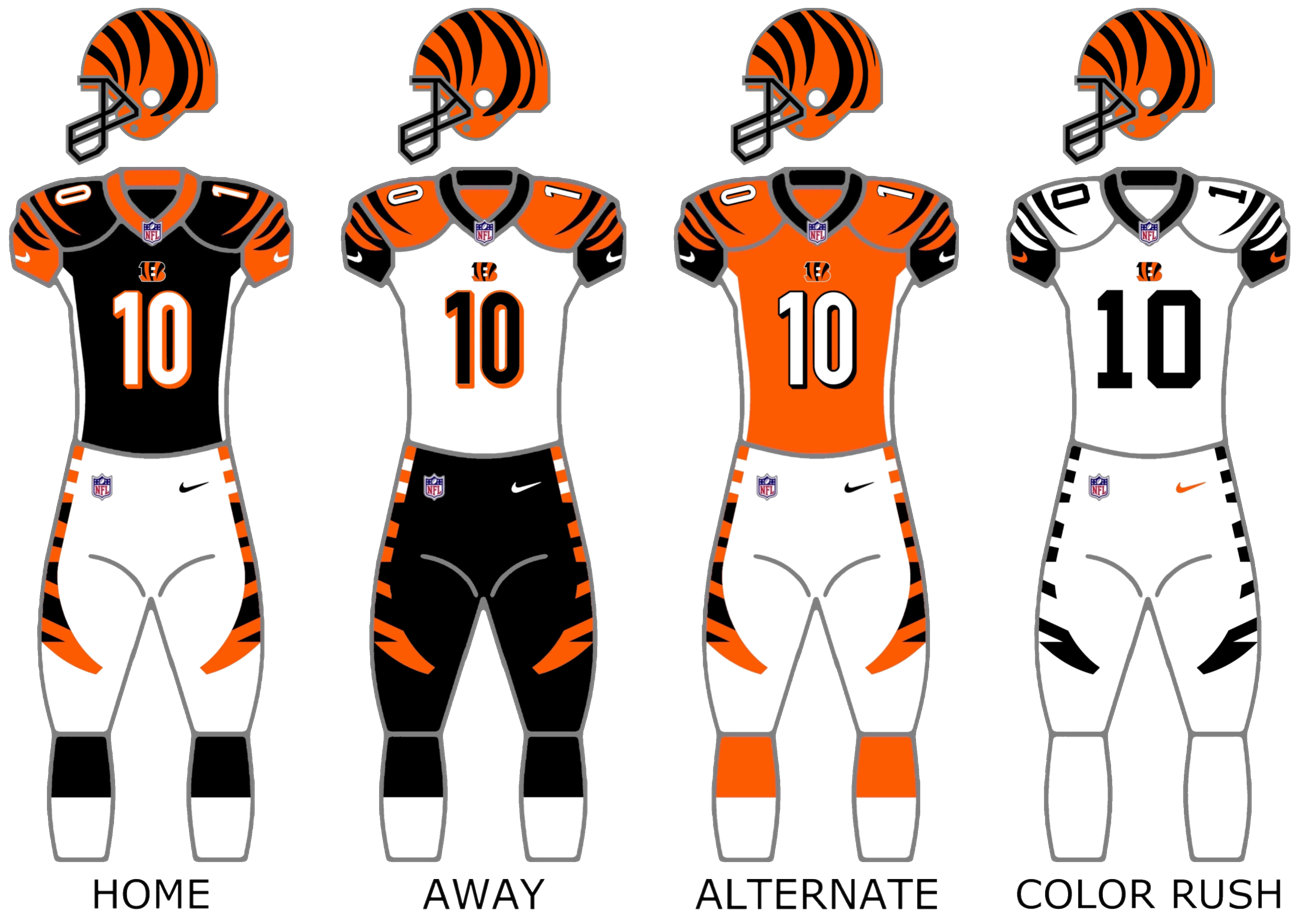

The 2020 season was the Cincinnati Bengals' 51st in the National Football League (NFL), their 53rd overall, and their second under head coach Zac Taylor.

For the first time since 2003, the Bengals had the first overall pick in the NFL draft, which they used to select LSU quarterback Joe Burrow. They improved upon their 2–14 record from 2019 but were eliminated from playoff contention for the 5th consecutive year after a week 13 loss to the Miami Dolphins. The Bengals doubled their win total from the previous season but still finished with a 4–11–1 record. As well, this was the first season since 2010 that the Bengals did not have Andy Dalton as their starting quarterback, as he was released and signed with the Dallas Cowboys. This was their most recent season with a losing record prior to 2025.

== Offseason ==
=== Free agents ===
==== Unrestricted ====
Position	Player	2020 Team	Date signed	Contract
DT	Andrew Billings	Cleveland Browns	March 19	1 year, $3.5 million
TE	Tyler Eifert	Jacksonville Jaguars	March 24	2 years, $15.5 million
S	Clayton Fejedelem	Miami Dolphins	March 16	3 years, $8.55 million
WR	A. J. Green	Cincinnati Bengals	March 16	Franchise tagged for 1 year, $17.865 million
G	John Jerry			
CB	Greg Mabin	Cincinnati Bengals	March 31	1 year, $825k
CB	Tony McRae	Detroit Lions	March 21	1 year, $1.5 million
CB	Torry McTyer	Cincinnati Bengals	March 21	1 year, $875k
MLB	Hardy Nickerson	Minnesota Vikings	August 18	1 year, $750k
ILB	LaRoy Reynolds	Atlanta Falcons	March 24	1 year, $1.05 million
DT	Niles Scott			
OLB	Nick Vigil	Los Angeles Chargers	March 24	1 year, $1.1875 million
DE	Kerry Wynn			
CB	Darqueze Dennard	Atlanta Falcons	August 3	1 year, $4.5 million

==== Restricted ====
Position	Player	2020 Team	Date signed	Contract
G	Alex Redmond	Cincinnati Bengals	March 23	1 year, $2.133 million
TE	Cethan Carter	Cincinnati Bengals	April 17	1 year, $2.133 million
S	Brandon Wilson	Cincinnati Bengals	April 26	1 year, $2.133 million
DT	Josh Tupou	Cincinnati Bengals	May 1	1 year, $2.133 million

=== Signings ===
Position	Player	2019 team	Date signed	Contract
NT	D. J. Reader	Houston Texans	March 17	4 years, $53 million
CB	Trae Waynes	Minnesota Vikings	March 17	3 years, $42 million
CB	Mackensie Alexander	Minnesota Vikings	March 18	1 year, $4 million
G	Xavier Su'a-Filo	Dallas Cowboys	March 18	3 years, $9 million
LB	Josh Bynes	Baltimore Ravens	March 24	1 year, $1.6 million
WR	Mike Thomas	Los Angeles Rams	March 24	1 year, $850k
S	Vonn Bell	New Orleans Saints	March 25	3 years, $18 million
CB	LeShaun Sims	Tennessee Titans	March 25	1 year, $1.7 million
RB	Jacques Patrick	Tampa Bay Vipers (XFL)	April 17	3 years, $2.285 million

=== Releases ===
Position	Player	2020 team	Date released
OT	Cordy Glenn		March 13
G	John Miller	Carolina Panthers	March 18
CB	B. W. Webb		March 18
CB	Dre Kirkpatrick	Arizona Cardinals	March 31
QB	Andy Dalton	Dallas Cowboys	April 30
RB	Devwah Whaley		August 3
TE	Moritz Böhringer		August 3

== Draft ==
2020 Cincinnati Bengals draft
Round	Pick	Player	Position	College	Notes
1	1	Joe Burrow *	QB	LSU	
2	33	Tee Higgins *	WR	Clemson	
3	65	Logan Wilson	OLB	Wyoming	
4	107	Akeem Davis-Gaither	MLB	Appalachian State	
5	147	Khalid Kareem	DE	Notre Dame	
6	180	Hakeem Adeniji	OT	Kansas	
7	215	Markus Bailey	LB	Purdue	
Made roster † Pro Football Hall of Fame * Made at least one Pro Bowl during career

=== Undrafted free agents ===
Player	Position	College	Signed
Kendall Futrell	LB	East Carolina	April 25
Josh Knipfel	G	Iowa State	April 25
Scotty Washington	WR	Wake Forest	April 25
Devwah Whaley	RB	Arkansas	April 25
Isaiah Swann	CB	Dartmouth	April 25
Clay Cordasco	OT	Oregon State	April 25
Marcel Spears Jr.	LB	Iowa State	April 25
Tyler Clark	DT	Georgia	April 26
Mitch Wilcox	TE	South Florida	April 26
Trey Dishon	DT	Kansas State	April 27

== Staff ==
2020 Cincinnati Bengals staff
Front office: President/general manager – Mike Brown; Executive vice president – Katie Blackburn; Vice president – Troy Blackburn; Vice president of player personnel – Paul H. Brown; Director of player personnel – Duke Tobin; Personnel executive – Bill Tobin; Scouting director (College) – Mike Potts; Scouting director (Pro) – Steven Radicivec; Head coaches: Head coach – Zac Taylor; Assistant head coach/Special teams coordinator – Darrin Simmons; Offensive coaches: Offensive coordinator – Brian Callahan; Quarterbacks – Dan Pitcher; Running backs – Jemal Singleton; Wide receivers – Bob Bicknell; Assistant wide receivers – Troy Walters; Tight ends – James Casey; Offensive line – Jim Turner; Assistant offensive line – Ben Martin; Offensive assistant – Brad Kragthorpe	Defensive coaches: Defensive coordinator – Lou Anarumo; Defensive line – Nick Eason; Linebackers – Al Golden; Secondary/safeties – Robert Livingston; Cornerbacks – Steve Jackson; Senior defensive assistant – Mark Duffner; Defensive assistant – Gerald Chatman; Defensive quality control – Jordan Kovacs; Special teams coaches: Assistant special teams – Colt Anderson; Strength and conditioning: Strength and conditioning – Joey Boese; Assistant strength and conditioning – Todd Hunt; Assistant strength and conditioning – Garrett Swanson

== Final roster ==
2020 Cincinnati Bengals roster
Quarterbacks (QB): 8 Brandon Allen; 5 Ryan Finley; Running backs (RB): 25 Giovani Bernard; 34 Samaje Perine; 32 Trayveon Williams; Wide receivers (WR): 83 Tyler Boyd; 12 Alex Erickson; 18 A. J. Green; 85 Tee Higgins; 17 Stanley Morgan Jr.; 80 Mike Thomas; Tight ends (TE): 82 Cethan Carter; 89 Drew Sample; 86 Mason Schreck; 84 Mitchell Wilcox	Offensive linemen (OL): 77 Hakeem Adeniji T; 68 Bobby Hart T; 66 Trey Hopkins C; 74 Fred Johnson T; 60 Michael Jordan G; 53 Billy Price C/G; 62 Alex Redmond G; 67 Quinton Spain G/T; 72 Xavier Suʻa-Filo G; 65 Keaton Sutherland G; Defensive linemen (DL): 91 Amani Bledsoe DE; 99 Christian Covington DT; 94 Sam Hubbard DE; 70 Margus Hunt DE; 90 Khalid Kareem DE; 58 Carl Lawson DE; 69 Kahlil McKenzie DT; 71 Xavier Williams DT	Linebackers (LB): 51 Markus Bailey MLB; 56 Josh Bynes MLB; 59 Akeem Davis-Gaither OLB; 50 Jordan Evans OLB; 57 Germaine Pratt OLB; 55 Logan Wilson MLB; Defensive backs (DB): 21 Mackensie Alexander CB; 30 Jessie Bates FS; 24 Vonn Bell SS; 27 Tony Brown CB; 37 Jalen Davis CB; 22 William Jackson CB; 23 Darius Phillips CB; 38 LeShaun Sims CB; 36 Shawn Williams SS; 40 Brandon Wilson FS; Special teams (ST): 4 Randy Bullock K; 46 Clark Harris LS; 10 Kevin Huber P; 3 Austin Seibert K	Practice squad: 92 Freedom Akinmoladun DE; 29 Brian Allen CB; 35 Trajan Bandy CB; 63 Shaq Calhoun G; 48 Dan Godsil LS; 41 Trayvon Henderson SS; 7 Kevin Hogan QB; 16 Trenton Irwin WR; 47 Keandre Jones OLB; 33 Donnie Lewis CB; 20 Torry McTyer CB (PS/I); 31 Jacques Patrick RB; 39 Winston Rose CB; 6 Kyle Shurmur QB; 14 Scotty Washington TE; Reserve: 97 Geno Atkins DT (IR); 9 Joe Burrow QB (IR); 76 Mike Daniels DT (COVID-19); 61 B. J. Finney C/G (NF-Inj.); 28 Joe Mixon RB (IR); 71 Isaiah Prince T (Opt-out); 98 D. J. Reader DT (IR); 11 John Ross WR (IR); 19 Auden Tate WR (IR); 91 Josh Tupou DT (Opt-out); 87 C. J. Uzomah TE (IR); 26 Trae Waynes CB (IR); 73 Jonah Williams T (IR); 95 Renell Wren DT (IR); Rookies in italics 53 active, 14 reserve, 14 practice squad (1 exempt)

== Preseason ==
The Bengals' preseason schedule was announced on May 7, but was later cancelled due to the COVID-19 pandemic.

Week	Date	Opponent	Venue	Result
1	August 15	at Kansas City Chiefs	Arrowhead Stadium	Cancelled due to the COVID-19 pandemic
2	August 21	Minnesota Vikings	Paul Brown Stadium	Cancelled due to the COVID-19 pandemic
3	August 28	at Atlanta Falcons	Mercedes-Benz Stadium	Cancelled due to the COVID-19 pandemic
4	September 3	Indianapolis Colts	Paul Brown Stadium	Cancelled due to the COVID-19 pandemic

== Regular season ==
=== Schedule ===
The Bengals' 2020 schedule was announced on May 7.

Week	Date	Opponent	Result	Record	Venue	Recap
1	September 13	Los Angeles Chargers	**L** 13–16	0–1	Paul Brown Stadium	Recap
2	September 17	at **Cleveland Browns**	**L** 30–35	0–2	FirstEnergy Stadium	Recap
3	September 27	at Philadelphia Eagles	**T** 23–23 (OT)	0–2–1	Lincoln Financial Field	Recap
4	October 4	Jacksonville Jaguars	**W** 33–25	1–2–1	Paul Brown Stadium	Recap
5	October 11	at **Baltimore Ravens**	**L** 3–27	1–3–1	M&T Bank Stadium	Recap
6	October 18	at Indianapolis Colts	**L** 27–31	1–4–1	Lucas Oil Stadium	Recap
7	October 25	**Cleveland Browns**	**L** 34–37	1–5–1	Paul Brown Stadium	Recap
8	November 1	Tennessee Titans	**W** 31–20	2–5–1	Paul Brown Stadium	Recap
9	Bye					
10	November 15	at **Pittsburgh Steelers**	**L** 10–36	2–6–1	Heinz Field	Recap
11	November 22	at Washington Football Team	**L** 9–20	2–7–1	FedExField	Recap
12	November 29	New York Giants	**L** 17–19	2–8–1	Paul Brown Stadium	Recap
13	December 6	at Miami Dolphins	**L** 7–19	2–9–1	Hard Rock Stadium	Recap
14	December 13	Dallas Cowboys	**L** 7–30	2–10–1	Paul Brown Stadium	Recap
15	December 21	**Pittsburgh Steelers**	**W** 27–17	3–10–1	Paul Brown Stadium	Recap
16	December 27	at Houston Texans	**W** 37–31	4–10–1	NRG Stadium	Recap
17	January 3	**Baltimore Ravens**	**L** 3–38	4–11–1	Paul Brown Stadium	Recap

Note: Intra-division opponents are in bold text.

=== Game summaries ===
==== Week 1: vs. Los Angeles Chargers ====
Week 1: Los Angeles Chargers at Cincinnati Bengals – Game summary

Quarter	1	2	3	4	Total
**Chargers**	0	6	0	10	**16**
Bengals	7	0	6	0	**13**

at Paul Brown Stadium, Cincinnati, Ohio

- Date: September 13
- Game time: 4:05 p.m. EDT
- Game weather: Partly cloudy, 83 °F (28 °C)
- Game attendance: 0
- Referee: Clay Martin
- TV announcers (CBS): Kevin Harlan, Trent Green and Melanie Collins
- Recap, Game Book

Game information

**First quarter**

- CIN – Joe Burrow 23-yard run (Randy Bullock kick), 2:24. Bengals 7–0. **Drive: 5 plays, 44 yards, 1:35.**

**Second quarter**

- LAC – Michael Badgley 24-yard field goal, 7:10. Bengals 7–3. **Drive: 11 plays, 74 yards, 4:08.**
- LAC – Michael Badgley 43-yard field goal, 0:00. Bengals 7–6. **Drive: 6 plays, 61 yards, 0:33.**

**Third quarter**

- CIN – Randy Bullock 50-yard field goal, 9:12. Bengals 10–6. **Drive: 7 plays, 29 yards, 2:28.**
- CIN – Randy Bullock 43-yard field goal, 1:32. Bengals 13–6. **Drive: 11 plays, 43 yards, 6:08.**

**Fourth quarter**

- LAC – Joshua Kelley 5-yard run (Michael Badgley kick), 12:23. Tied 13–13. **Drive: 10 plays, 55 yards, 4:09.**
- LAC – Michael Badgley 22-yard field goal, 8:56. Chargers 16–13. **Drive: 8 plays, 21 yards, 3:18.**

**Top passers**

- LAC – Tyrod Taylor – 16/30, 208 yards
- CIN – Joe Burrow – 23/36, 193 yards, INT

**Top rushers**

- LAC – Austin Ekeler – 19 rushes, 84 yards
- CIN – Joe Mixon – 19 rushes, 69 yards

**Top receivers**

- LAC – Hunter Henry – 5 receptions, 73 yards
- CIN – A. J. Green – 5 receptions, 51 yards

The Bengals began their season at home against the Chargers in what would be the debut pro game for new starting QB and first round draft pick Joe Burrow. In the first quarter, the Bengals scored its only points when Burrow ran for a 23-yard TD to make it 7–0. The Chargers tacked on a pair of field goals in the second quarter to make it 7-6 when Michael Badgley made them from 24 and 43 yards out for a 1-point deficit at halftime. The Bengals then scored a pair of field goals of their own in the third quarter, when Randy Bullock made 50 and 43 yarders for a TD lead of 13–6. However, in the fourth, the Chargers took the lead as Joshua Kelley ran for a 5-yard TD, followed up by Badgley kicking a 22-yard field goal to make it 16–13. The Bengals got the ball back and were able to drive deep into Chargers' territory. After a what appeared to be a TD pass from Burrow to Green was overturned due to an offensive penalty, the Bengals then brought out Bullock for the game-tying field goal to send the game into overtime. Bullock missed the field goal wide right, losing the game for the Bengals.

With the loss, the Bengals started 0–1.

==== Week 2: at Cleveland Browns ====
Week 2: Cincinnati Bengals at Cleveland Browns – Game summary

Quarter	1	2	3	4	Total
Bengals	3	10	3	14	**30**
**Browns**	7	14	7	7	**35**

at FirstEnergy Stadium, Cleveland, Ohio

- Date: September 17
- Game time: 8:20 pm. EDT
- Game weather: 65 °F (18 °C)
- Game attendance: 6,000
- Referee: Shawn Smith
- TV announcers (NFLN): Joe Buck, Troy Aikman, Erin Andrews and Kristina Pink
- Recap, Game Book

Game information

**First quarter**

- CIN – Randy Bullock 38-yard field goal, 7:15. Bengals 3–0. **Drive: 15 plays, 41 yards, 7:47.**
- CLE – Nick Chubb 11-yard run (Cody Parkey kick), 1:54. Browns 7–3, **Drive: 10 plays, 75 yards, 5:25.**

**Second quarter**

- CLE – Odell Beckham Jr. 43-yard pass from Baker Mayfield (Cody Parkey kick), 11:54. Browns 14–3. **Drive: 3 plays, 57 yards, 1:34.**
- CIN – C. J. Uzomah 23-yard pass from Joe Burrow (Randy Bullock kick), 9:00. Browns 14–10. **Drive: 6 plays, 57 yards, 2:54.**
- CLE – Kareem Hunt 6-yard pass from Baker Mayfield (Cody Parkey kick), 1:31. Browns 21–10. **Drive: 12 plays, 63 yards, 3:54.**
- CIN – Randy Bullock 43-yard field goal, 0:06. Browns 21–13. **Drive: 12 plays, 50 yards, 1:29.**

**Third quarter**

- CLE – Nick Chubb 1-yard run (Cody Parkey kick), 5:45. Browns 28–13. **Drive: 2 plays, 1 yard, 0:08.**
- CIN – Randy Bullock 27-yard field goal, 0:23. Browns 28–16. **Drive: 14 plays, 51 yards, 5:25.**

**Fourth quarter**

- CIN – Mike Thomas 4-yard pass from Joe Burrow (Randy Bullock kick), 3:55. Browns 28–23. **Drive: 14 plays, 83 yards, 5:27.**
- CLE – Kareem Hunt 1-yard run (Cody Parkey kick), 3:55. Browns 35–23. **Drive: 6 plays, 75 yards, 2:00.**
- CIN – Tyler Boyd 9-yard pass from Joe Burrow (Randy Bullock kick), 0:48. Browns 35–30. **Drive: 16 plays, 75 yards, 3:12.**

**Top passers**

- CIN – Joe Burrow – 37/61, 316 yards, 3 TD
- CLE – Baker Mayfield – 16/23, 219 yards, 2 TD, INT

**Top rushers**

- CIN – Joe Mixon – 16 rushes, 46 yards
- CLE – Nick Chubb – 22 rushes, 124 yards, 2 TD

**Top receivers**

- CIN – Tyler Boyd – 7 receptions, 72 yards, TD
- CLE – Odell Beckham Jr. – 4 receptions, 74 yards, TD

After losing their regular season-opening game at home, the Bengals then traveled to Cleveland to face the Browns for Battle of Ohio Round 1. In the first quarter, the Bengals scored first when Randy Bullock kicked a 38-yard field goal to make it 3–0. Though, the Browns took the lead when Nick Chubb ran for an 11-yard TD to make it 7–3. In the second quarter, the Browns went up by double digits when Baker Mayfield found O'dell Beckham Jr. on a 43-yard TD pass to make it 14–3. The Bengals then came within 4 after Joe Burrow found C.J. Uzomah on a 23-yard TD pass to make it 14–10. Mayfield then found Kareem Hunt on a 6-yard TD pass to put the Browns up by double digits, 21–10. Though, the Bengals closed out the half when Randy Bullock kicked a 43-yard field goal to make it 21–13 at halftime. In the third quarter, the Browns went back up by double digits when Chubb ran for a 1-yard TD to make it 28–13. The Bengals drew closer with Bullock's 27-yard field goal to make it 28–16. In the fourth quarter, the Bengals were able to get within 5 when Burrow found Mike Thomas on a 4-yard TD pass to make the score 28–23. Though, the Browns would go back up by double digits yet again when Hunt punched the ball in for a 1-yard TD to make it 35–23. The Bengals wrapped up the scoring when Burrow found Tyler Boyd on a 9-yard TD pass to make the final score 35–30.

With the loss, the Bengals fell to 0–2 for the second straight season and last place in the AFC North.

==== Week 3: at Philadelphia Eagles ====
Week 3: Cincinnati Bengals at Philadelphia Eagles – Game summary

Quarter	1	2	3	4	OT	Total
Bengals	0	10	7	6	0	**23**
Eagles	0	13	3	7	0	**23**

at Lincoln Financial Field, Philadelphia, Pennsylvania

- Date: September 27
- Game time: 1:00 pm. EDT
- Game weather: Cloudy, 76 °F (24 °C)
- Game attendance: 0
- Referee: Adrian Hill
- TV announcers (CBS): Spero Dedes and Adam Archuleta
- Recap, Game Book

Game information

**First quarter**

- No scoring plays.

**Second quarter**

- PHI – Jake Elliott 27-yard field goal, 14:57. Eagles 3–0. **Drive: 16 plays, 82 yards, 6:59.**
- CIN – Randy Bullock 48-yard field goal, 7:33. Tied 3–3. **Drive: 4 plays, 8 yards, 1:17.**
- PHI – Jake Elliott 42-yard field goal, 2:47. Eagles 6–3. **Drive: 10 plays, 51 yards, 4:46.**
- CIN – Tee Higgins 1-yard pass from Joe Burrow (Randy Bullock kick), 1:29. Bengals 10–6. **Drive: 8 plays, 75 yards, 1:18.**
- PHI – Greg Ward 29-yard pass from Carson Wentz (Jake Elliott kick), 0:16. Eagles 13–10. **Drive: 5 plays, 60 yards, 1:13.**

**Third quarter**

- PHI – Jake Elliott 54-yard field goal, 8:39. Eagles 16–10. **Drive: 10 plays, 39 yards, 6:21.**
- CIN – Tee Higgins 4-yard pass from Joe Burrow (Randy Bullock kick), 2:22. Bengals 17–16. **Drive: 10 plays, 76 yards, 6:17.**

**Fourth quarter**

- CIN – Randy Bullock 31-yard field goal, 14:52. Bengals 20–16. **Drive: 7 plays, 31 yards, 1:53.**
- CIN – Randy Bullock 25-yard field goal, 3:05. Bengals 23–16. **Drive: 12 plays, 81 yards, 6:59.**
- PHI – Carson Wentz 7-yard run (Jake Elliott kick), 0:21. Tied 23–23. **Drive: 11 plays, 75 yards, 2:44.**

**Top passers**

- CIN – Joe Burrow – 31/44, 312 yards, 2 TD
- PHI – Carson Wentz – 29/47, 225 yards, TD, 2 INT

**Top rushers**

- CIN – Joe Mixon – 17 rushes, 49 yards
- PHI – Miles Sanders – 18 rushes, 95 yards

**Top receivers**

- CIN – Tyler Boyd – 10 receptions, 125 yards
- PHI – Greg Ward – 8 receptions, 72 yards, TD

The Bengals traveled to Philadelphia seeking their first win of the season. After a scoreless first quarter, the Bengals and Eagles traded field goals to start the second. Cincinnati took its first lead of the game when Joe Burrow found Tee Higgins for a 1-yard touchdown, but the Eagles responded with a touchdown of their own to take a 13–10 lead at halftime. The Eagles padded their lead to 16–10 early in the third on a Jake Elliott field goal, but Higgins' second touchdown reception of the afternoon put the Bengals back in front, 17–16. Cincinnati built its lead to seven points with two Randy Bullock field goals in the fourth quarter, but a last-minute touchdown run by Carson Wentz would tie the game and force overtime. In overtime, the two defenses would hold strong, with neither team being able to get in scoring range until the Eagles got to the Bengals' 41 late in the extra period. However, a false start on fourth down would move Philadelphia out of field goal range, and they punted with only a few seconds left. With no time to get back into scoring range or score a winning touchdown, the Bengals could only run one play to their own 20 yard line before time expired.

With their fourth tie in 13 seasons and their second in their past four meetings against the Eagles, the Bengals improved to 0–2–1 and remained in last place in the AFC North. The Bengals also ended a 14-game road losing streak dating back to 2018.

==== Week 4: vs. Jacksonville Jaguars ====
Week 4: Jacksonville Jaguars at Cincinnati Bengals – Game summary

Quarter	1	2	3	4	Total
Jaguars	7	6	0	12	**25**
**Bengals**	3	7	17	6	**33**

at Paul Brown Stadium, Cincinnati, Ohio

- Date: October 4
- Game time: 1:00 pm. EDT
- Game weather: Cloudy, 64 °F (18 °C)
- Game attendance: 6,243
- Referee: Alex Kemp
- TV announcers (CBS): Tom McCarthy and Jay Feely
- Recap, Game Book

Game information

**First quarter**

- CIN – Randy Bullock 35-yard field goal, 2:41. Bengals 3–0. **Drive: 9 plays, 45 yards, 3:57.**
- JAX – D. J. Chark 11-yard pass from Gardner Minshew (Aldrick Rosas kick), 0:21. Jaguars 7–3. **Drive: 5 plays, 75 yards, 2:20.**

**Second quarter**

- JAX – Aldrick Rosas 32-yard field goal, 3:45. Jaguars 10–3. **Drive: 11 plays, 66 yards, 5:36.**
- CIN – Joe Mixon 9-yard pass from Joe Burrow (Randy Bullock kick), 0:56. Tied 10–10. **Drive: 9 plays, 75 yards, 2:49.**
- JAX – Aldrick Rosas 20-yard field goal, 0:03. Jaguars 13–10. **Drive: 8 plays, 73 yards, 0:53.**

**Third quarter**

- CIN – Joe Mixon 34-yard run (Randy Bullock kick), 12:29. Bengals 17–13. **Drive: 5 plays, 75 yards, 2:31.**
- CIN – Joe Mixon 23-yard run (Randy Bullock kick), 8:28. Bengals 24–13. **Drive: 7 plays, 56 yards, 3:09.**
- CIN – Randy Bullock 40-yard field goal, 3:29. Bengals 27–13. **Drive: 8 plays, 37 yards, 3:25.**

**Fourth quarter**

- JAX – Aldrick Rosas 50-yard field goal, 14:33. Bengals 27–16. **Drive: 9 plays, 43 yards, 3:56.**
- CIN – Randy Bullock 46-yard field goal, 9:20. Bengals 30–16. **Drive: 10 plays, 47 yards, 5:13.**
- JAX – D. J. Chark 2-yard pass from Gardner Minshew (pass failed), 6:17. Bengals 30–22. **Drive: 8 plays, 75 yards, 3:06.**
- CIN – Randy Bullock 30-yard field goal, 1:46. Bengals 33–22. **Drive: 10 plays, 66 yards, 4:28.**
- JAX – Aldrick Rosas 30-yard field goal, 0:08. Bengals 33–25. **Drive: 6 plays, 63 yards, 1:38.**

**Top passers**

- JAX – Gardner Minshew – 27/40, 351 yards, 2 TD, INT
- CIN – Joe Burrow – 25/36, 300 yards, TD, INT

**Top rushers**

- JAX – James Robinson – 17 rushes, 75 yards
- CIN – Joe Mixon – 25 rushes, 151 yards, 2 TD

**Top receivers**

- JAX – D. J. Chark – 8 receptions, 95 yards, 2 TD
- CIN – Tyler Boyd – 7 receptions, 90 yards

QB Joe Burrow earned his first win as an NFL starter, throwing for 300 yards, a touchdown, and an interception. RB Joe Mixon turned in a huge performance with 151 rushing yards and two touchdowns as well as a receiving touchdown.

==== Week 5: at Baltimore Ravens ====
Week 5: Cincinnati Bengals at Baltimore Ravens – Game summary

Quarter	1	2	3	4	Total
Bengals	0	0	0	3	**3**
**Ravens**	10	7	3	7	**27**

at M&T Bank Stadium, Baltimore, Maryland

- Date: October 11
- Game time: 1:00 pm. EDT
- Game weather: Cloudy, 69 °F (21 °C)
- Game attendance: 0
- Referee: Jerome Boger
- TV announcers (CBS): Greg Gumbel, Rich Gannon and Melanie Collins
- Recap, Game Book

Game information

**First quarter**

- BAL – Justin Tucker 46-yard field goal, 10:40. Ravens 3–0. **Drive: 6 plays, 52 yards, 2:07.**
- BAL – Mark Andrews 5-yard pass from Lamar Jackson (Justin Tucker kick), 0:40. Ravens 10–0. **Drive: 15 plays, 62 yards, 7:19.**

**Second quarter**

- BAL – Marquise Brown 2-yard pass from Lamar Jackson (Justin Tucker kick), 14:56. Ravens 17–0. **Drive: 2 plays, 31 yards, 0:24.**

**Third quarter**

- BAL – Justin Tucker 39-yard field goal, 2:36. Ravens 20–0. **Drive: 7 plays, 44 yards, 3:32.**

**Fourth quarter**

- BAL – Patrick Queen 53-yard fumble return (Justin Tucker kick), 8:21. Ravens 27–0.
- CIN – Randy Bullock 38-yard field goal, 0:32. Ravens 27–3. **Drive: 14 plays, 55 yards, 7:49.**

**Top passers**

- CIN – Joe Burrow – 19/30, 183 yards, INT
- BAL – Lamar Jackson – 19/37, 180 yards, 2 TD, INT

**Top rushers**

- CIN – Joe Mixon – 24 rushes, 59 yards
- BAL – Mark Ingram II – 11 rushes, 57 yards

**Top receivers**

- CIN – Tee Higgins – 4 receptions, 62 yards
- BAL – Marquise Brown – 6 receptions, 77 yards, TD

The Bengals then traveled to Baltimore for Round 1 against the Ravens. After trailing 27–0, the Bengals wrapped up the scoring in the fourth quarter with Randy Bullock's 38-yard field goal to make the final score 27–3.

With their fourth straight loss to the Ravens, the Bengals fell to 1–3–1.

==== Week 6: at Indianapolis Colts ====
Week 6: Cincinnati Bengals at Indianapolis Colts – Game summary

Quarter	1	2	3	4	Total
Bengals	14	10	3	0	**27**
**Colts**	0	21	0	10	**31**

at Lucas Oil Stadium, Indianapolis, Indiana

- Date: October 18
- Game time: 1:00 pm. EDT
- Game weather: Cloudy, 57 °F (14 °C) (retractable roof open)
- Game attendance: 12,453
- Referee: Land Clark
- TV announcers (Fox): Kevin Kugler, Chris Spielman and Laura Okmin
- Recap, Game Book

Game information

**First quarter**

- CIN – Giovani Bernard 2-yard run (Randy Bullock kick), 11:17. Bengals 7–0. **Drive: 7 plays, 43 yards, 2:48.**
- CIN – Joe Burrow 2-yard run (Randy Bullock kick), 3:18. Bengals 14–0. **Drive: 12 plays, 78 yards, 5:59.**

**Second quarter**

- CIN – Joe Mixon 7-yard run (Randy Bullock kick), 14:56. Bengals 21–0. **Drive: 4 plays, 70 yards, 1:49.**
- IND – Trey Burton 1-yard run (Rodrigo Blankenship kick), 12:18. Bengals 21–7. **Drive: 7 plays, 87 yards, 2:38.**
- CIN – Randy Bullock 47-yard field goal, 8:04. Bengals 24–7. **Drive: 9 plays, 46 yards, 4:14.**
- IND – Trey Burton 10-yard pass from Philip Rivers (Rodrigo Blankenship kick), 4:38. Bengals 24–14. **Drive: 9 plays, 75 yards, 3:26.**
- IND – Zach Pascal 17-yard pass from Philip Rivers (Rodrigo Blankenship kick), 0:15. Bengals 24–21. **Drive: 9 plays, 72 yards, 2:43.**

**Third quarter**

- CIN – Randy Bullock 55-yard field goal, 3:32. Bengals 27–21. **Drive: 13 plays, 62 yards, 6:03.**

**Fourth quarter**

- IND – Jack Doyle 14-yard pass from Philip Rivers (Rodrigo Blankenship kick), 14:55. Colts 28–27. **Drive: 7 plays, 75 yards, 3:37.**
- IND – Rodrigo Blankenship 40-yard field goal, 4:03. Colts 31–27. **Drive: 10 plays, 40 yards, 3:59.**

**Top passers**

- CIN – Joe Burrow – 25/39, 313 yards, INT
- IND – Philip Rivers – 29/44, 371 yards, 3 TD, INT

**Top rushers**

- CIN – Joe Mixon – 18 rushes, 54 yards, TD
- IND – Jonathan Taylor – 12 rushes, 60 yards

**Top receivers**

- CIN – Tee Higgins – 6 receptions, 125 yards
- IND – Marcus Johnson – 5 receptions, 108 yards

After a huge loss, the Bengals traveled again to take on the Colts. From the first into the second quarter, the Bengals jumped out to a 21–0 lead when Giovani Bernard ran for a 2-yard touchdown, followed by Joe Burrow and Joe Mixon running for 2-yard and 7-yard touchdowns respectively. Trey Burton scored a 1-yard touchdown of his own to get the Colts on the board 21–7. The Bengals' lead increased with Randy Bullock's 47-yard field goal to make it 24–7. The Colts scored twice to come within 3 before halftime when Burton ran for a 10-yard touchdown, followed by Philip Rivers finding Zach Pascal on a 17-yard touchdown pass to make it 24–21. In the third quarter, the Bengals increased their lead when Bullock kicked a 55-yard field goal to make it 27-21 and the quarter's only score. In the fourth quarter, however, it was all Colts when Rivers found Jack Doyle on a 14-yard touchdown pass, taking the lead at 28–27. Rodrigo Blankenship then kicked a 40-yard field goal to make it 31–27. With seconds left, the Bengals got the ball back. However, Burrow would throw the game-losing interception, sealing yet another loss.

With the loss, the Bengals fell to 1–4–1.

==== Week 7: vs. Cleveland Browns ====
Week 7: Cleveland Browns at Cincinnati Bengals – Game summary

Quarter	1	2	3	4	Total
**Browns**	3	7	7	20	**37**
Bengals	7	10	3	14	**34**

at Paul Brown Stadium, Cincinnati, Ohio

- Date: October 25
- Game time: 1:00 pm. EDT
- Game weather: Cloudy, 48 °F (9 °C)
- Game attendance: 9,732
- Referee: Tony Corrente
- TV announcers (CBS): Spero Dedes and Adam Archuleta
- Recap, Game Book

Game information

**First quarter**

- CIN – Joe Burrow 1-yard run (Randy Bullock kick), 6:47. Bengals 7–0. **Drive: 3 plays, 24 yards, 1:34.**
- CLE – Cody Parkey 43-yard field goal, 1:21. Bengals 7–3. **Drive: 5 plays, 8 yards, 1:39.**

**Second quarter**

- CIN – Randy Bullock 37-yard field goal, 11:09. Bengals 10–3. **Drive: 11 plays, 65 yards, 5:12.**
- CLE – Harrison Bryant 3-yard pass from Baker Mayfield (Cody Parkey kick), 3:39. Tied 10–10. **Drive: 11 plays, 75 yards, 7:30.**
- CIN – Tyler Boyd 11-yard pass from Joe Burrow (Cody Parkey kick), 0:15. Bengals 17–10. **Drive: 10 plays, 75 yards, 3:24.**

**Third quarter**

- CLE – Harrison Bryant 6-yard pass from Baker Mayfield (Cody Parkey kick), 9:32. Tied 17–17. **Drive: 9 plays, 75 yards, 5:28.**
- CIN – Randy Bullock 23-yard field goal, 2:51. Bengals 20–17. **Drive: 12 plays, 71 yards, 6:41.**

**Fourth quarter**

- CLE – David Njoku 16-yard pass from Baker Mayfield (Cody Parkey kick), 13:13. Browns 24–20. **Drive: 8 plays, 79 yards, 4:38.**
- CIN – Tee Higgins 16-yard pass from Joe Burrow (Randy Bullock kick), 8:45. Bengals 27–24. **Drive: 12 plays, 80 yards, 4:28.**
- CLE – Kareem Hunt 8-yard pass from Baker Mayfield (Cody Parkey kick), 4:53. Browns 31–27. **Drive: 7 plays, 75 yards, 3:52.**
- CIN – Giovani Bernard 3-yard pass from Joe Burrow (Randy Bullock kick), 1:06. Bengals 34–31. **Drive: 12 plays, 75 yards, 3:47.**
- CLE – Donovan Peoples-Jones 24-yard pass from Baker Mayfield (kick failed), 0:11. Browns 37–34. **Drive: 5 plays, 75 yards, 0:55.**

**Top passers**

- CLE – Baker Mayfield – 22/28, 297 yards, 5 TD, INT
- CIN – Joe Burrow – 35/47, 406 yards, 3 TD, INT

**Top rushers**

- CLE – Kareem Hunt – 18 rushes, 76 yards
- CIN – Giovani Bernard – 13 rushes, 37 yards

**Top receivers**

- CLE – Rashard Higgins – 6 receptions, 110 yards
- CIN – Tyler Boyd – 11 receptions, 101 yards, TD

After another tough road loss, the Bengals went home to take on the Browns in Battle of Ohio Round 2. The Bengals scored first in the first quarter when Joe Burrow ran for a 1-yard touchdown to make it 7–0. The Browns then got on the board when Cody Parkey kicked a 43-yard field goal to make it 7–3. The Bengals then went up by a touchdown when Randy Bullock kicked a 37-yard field goal to make it 10–3. However, the Browns tied the game at 10-10 when Baker Mayfield connected with Harrison Bryant for a 3-yard touchdown. Burrow and Tyler Boyd then connected for an 11-yard touchdown pass to give the Bengals a 17–10 lead at halftime. In the third quarter, Mayfield and Harrison connected again to tie the game at 17–17 with a 6-yard touchdown pass. Bullock kicked a 20-yard field goal to make it 20–17 in favor of the Bengals getting the lead back. In a back-and-forth fourth quarter, the Browns took the lead when Mayfield found David Njoku on a 16-yard touchdown pass to make it 24–20. Burrow then put the Bengals back in the lead with a 16-yard touchdown pass to Tee Higgins to make it 27–24. The Browns moved back into the lead when Kareem Hunt caught an 8-yard touchdown pass from Mayfield to make it 31–27. The Bengals moved into a late lead when Joe Burrow found Giovani Bernard on a 3-yard touchdown pass to make it 34–31.

Despite taking the lead with 1:06 remaining in the 4th quarter, the Bengals allowed the Browns to drive down the field and allowed Mayfield to find Donovan Peoples-Jones to score the game-winning touchdown (with a failed PAT) with 11 seconds remaining, sealing the Bengals' fate.

The Bengals lost 37–34 and fell to 1–5–1 on the season after being swept by the Browns for the second time in three years.

==== Week 8: vs. Tennessee Titans ====
Week 8: Tennessee Titans at Cincinnati Bengals – Game summary

Quarter	1	2	3	4	Total
Titans	0	7	0	13	**20**
**Bengals**	3	14	0	14	**31**

at Paul Brown Stadium, Cincinnati, Ohio

- Date: November 1
- Game time: 1:00 pm. EST
- Game weather: Sunny, 48 °F (9 °C)
- Game attendance: 9,712
- Referee: Scott Novak
- TV announcers (CBS): Spero Dedes and Adam Archuleta
- Recap, Game Book

Game information

**First quarter**

- CIN – Randy Bullock 33-yard field goal, 9:48. Bengals 3–0. **Drive: 12 plays, 57 yards, 5:12.**

**Second quarter**

- CIN – Samaje Perine 1-yard run (Randy Bullock kick), 10:26. Bengals 10–0. **Drive: 9 plays, 57 yards, 4:59.**
- TEN – Derrick Henry 3-yard run (Stephen Gostkowski kick), 6:04. Bengals 10–7. **Drive: 10 plays, 75 yards, 4:22.**
- CIN – Giovani Bernard 12-yard run (Randy Bullock kick), 0:32. Bengals 17–7. **Drive: 9 plays, 73 yards, 5:32.**

**Third quarter**

- No scoring plays.

**Fourth quarter**

- CIN – Tyler Boyd 7-yard pass from Joe Burrow (Randy Bullock kick), 13:55. Bengals 24–7. **Drive: 12 plays, 86 yards, 5:37.**
- TEN – A. J. Brown 9-yard pass from Ryan Tannehill (Stephen Gostkowski kick), 11:20. Bengals 24–14. **Drive: 9 plays, 75 yards, 2:35.**
- CIN – Giovani Bernard 6-yard pass from Joe Burrow (Randy Bullock kick), 7:30. Bengals 31–14. **Drive: 7 plays, 44 yards, 3:50.**
- TEN – Corey Davis 12-yard pass from Ryan Tannehill (pass failed), 5:56. Bengals 31–20. **Drive: 6 plays, 75 yards, 1:34.**

**Top passers**

- TEN – Ryan Tannehill – 18/30, 233 yards, 2 TD, INT
- CIN – Joe Burrow – 26/37, 249 yards, 2 TD

**Top rushers**

- TEN – Derrick Henry – 18 rushes, 112 yards, TD
- CIN – Giovani Bernard – 15 rushes, 62 yards, TD

**Top receivers**

- TEN – Corey Davis – 8 receptions, 128 yards, TD
- CIN – Tee Higgins – 6 receptions, 78 yards

After another loss, the Bengals stayed home to play against the Titans. In the first quarter, the Bengals scored the only points to make it 3–0 when Randy Bullock kicked a 33-yard field goal. They made it 10–0 when Samaje Perine ran for a 1-yard touchdown. The Titans finally got on the board when Derrick Henry ran for a 3-yard touchdown to make it 10–7. Though, the Bengals pulled away when Giovani Bernard ran for a 12-yard touchdown to make it 17–7 at halftime. After a scoreless third quarter, the Bengals got back to work in the fourth quarter when Joe Burrow found Tyler Boyd on a 7-yard touchdown pass to make it 24–7. The Titans drew closer when Ryan Tannehill found A. J. Brown on a 9-yard touchdown pass to make it 24–14. Bernard then caught a 6-yard touchdown pass from Burrow to make it 31–14. And then Tannehill found Corey Davis on a 12-yard touchdown pass (with a failed 2-point conversion) to make the final score 31–20.

With the win, the Bengals go into their bye week at 2–5–1.

==== Week 10: at Pittsburgh Steelers ====
Week 10: Cincinnati Bengals at Pittsburgh Steelers – Game summary

Quarter	1	2	3	4	Total
Bengals	0	7	0	3	**10**
**Steelers**	12	10	7	7	**36**

at Heinz Field, Pittsburgh, Pennsylvania

- Date: November 15
- Game time: 4:25 pm. EST
- Game weather: Cloudy, 52 °F (11 °C)
- Game attendance: 5,909
- Referee: Adrian Hill
- TV announcers (Fox): Kenny Albert, Jonathan Vilma and Shannon Spake
- Recap, Game Book

Game information

**First quarter**

- PIT – Chris Boswell 41-yard field goal, 11:23. Steelers 3–0. **Drive: 4 plays, 9 yards, 2:01.**
- PIT – Chris Boswell 30-yard field goal, 4:50. Steelers 6–0. **Drive: 6 plays, 34 yards, 2:25**
- PIT – Diontae Johnson 12-yard pass from Ben Roethlisberger (pass failed), 1:51. Steelers 12–0. **Drive: 3 plays, 74 yards, 1:01.**

**Second quarter**

- CIN – Tee Higgins 2-yard pass from Joe Burrow (Randy Bullock kick), 10:37. Steelers 12–7. **Drive: 8 plays, 90 yards, 3:21.**
- PIT – JuJu Smith-Schuster 8-yard pass from Ben Roethlisberger (Chris Boswell kick), 7:23. Steelers 19–7. **Drive: 7 plays, 78 yards, 3:14.**
- PIT – Chris Boswell 45-yard field goal, 1:48. Steelers 22–7. **Drive: 8 plays, 57 yards, 2:20.**

**Third quarter**

- PIT – Chase Claypool 11-yard pass from Ben Roethlisberger (Chris Boswell kick), 4:22. Steelers 29–7. **Drive: 5 plays, 15 yards, 4:12.**

**Fourth quarter**

- PIT – Chase Claypool 5-yard pass from Ben Roethlisberger (Chris Boswell kick), 10:31. Steelers 36–7. **Drive: 5 plays, 15 yards, 2:41.**
- CIN – Randy Bullock 37-yard field goal, 5:05. Steelers 36–10. **Drive: 10 plays, 56 yards, 5:26.**

**Top passers**

- CIN – Joe Burrow – 21/40, 213 yards, TD
- PIT – Ben Roethlisberger – 27/46, 333 yards, 4 TD

**Top rushers**

- CIN – Samaje Perine – 7 rushes, 48 yards
- PIT – James Conner – 13 rushes, 36 yards

**Top receivers**

- CIN – Tee Higgins – 7 receptions, 115 yards, TD
- PIT – Diontae Johnson – 6 receptions, 116 yards, TD

Coming off of their bye week, the Bengals traveled to Pittsburgh for Round 1 against the Steelers. In the first quarter, the Steelers jumped out to a 12–0 lead after 2 field goals from Chris Boswell, from 41 and 30 yards out, followed by Ben Roethlisberger connecting with Diontae Johnson on a 12-yard TD pass (with a failed 2-point conversion). The Bengals responded in the second quarter, coming within 5 when Joe Burrow found Tee Higgins on a 2-yard TD pass to make it 12–7. However, the Steelers would pull away by double digits before halftime when Roethlisberger found JuJu Smith-Schuster on an 8-yard TD pass to make it 19–7. Finally, Boswell kicked a 45-yard field goal to make it 22–7 at halftime. The Steelers scored the only points of the third quarter when Roethlisberger connected with Chase Claypool for an 11-yard TD pass to make it 29–7. In the fourth quarter, Roethlisberger and Claypool connected again for a 5-yard TD pass, putting the team up 36–7. The Bengals wrapped up the scoring of the game with Randy Bullock's 37-yard field goal to make the final score 36–10.

With their 11th straight loss to the Steelers, the Bengals fell to 2–6–1.

==== Week 11: at Washington Football Team ====
Week 11: Cincinnati Bengals at Washington Football Team – Game summary

Quarter	1	2	3	4	Total
Bengals	0	9	0	0	**9**
**Washington**	7	0	10	3	**20**

at FedExField, Landover, Maryland

- Date: November 22
- Game time: 1:00 pm. EST
- Game weather: Cloudy, 57 °F (14 °C)
- Game attendance: 0
- Referee: Shawn Smith
- TV announcers (CBS): Spero Dedes and Adam Archuleta
- Recap, Game Book

Game information

**First quarter**

- WAS – Antonio Gibson 1-yard run (Dustin Hopkins kick), 1:38. Football Team 7–0. **Drive: 8 plays, 76 yards, 4:06.**

**Second quarter**

- CIN – A. J. Green 5-yard pass from Joe Burrow (kick failed), 7:32. Football Team 7–6. **Drive: 7 plays, 68 yards, 3:29.**
- CIN – Randy Bullock 53-yard field goal, 1:39. Bengals 9–7. **Drive: 9 plays, 41 yards, 3:39.**

**Third quarter**

- WAS – Steven Sims 3-yard pass from Alex Smith (Dustin Hopkins kick), 8:58. Football Team 14–9. **Drive: 5 plays, 55 yards, 2:27.**
- WAS – Dustin Hopkins 32-yard field goal, 4:47. Football Team 17–9. **Drive: 6 plays, 49 yards, 2:16.**

**Fourth quarter**

- WAS – Dustin Hopkins 50-yard field goal, 9:44. Football Team 20–9. **Drive: 14 plays, 65 yards, 7:24.**

**Top passers**

- CIN – Joe Burrow – 22/34, 203 yards, TD
- WAS – Alex Smith – 17/25, 166 yards, TD, INT

**Top rushers**

- CIN – Samaje Perine – 5 rushes, 19 yards
- WAS – Antonio Gibson – 16 rushes, 94 yards, TD

**Top receivers**

- CIN – Tyler Boyd – 9 receptions, 85 yards
- WAS – Terry McLaurin – 5 receptions, 84 yards

After a horrifying loss, the Bengals traveled again this time to take on the Washington Football Team. In the first quarter, Washington scored the only points off of an Antonio Gibson 1-yard TD run to make it 7–0. The Bengals got on the board in the second quarter when Joe Burrow found A. J. Green on a 5-yard TD pass (with a failed PAT) to make it 7–6. They then took the lead at halftime when Randy Bullock kicked a 53-yard field goal to make it 9–7. In the second half, it was all Washington as they would win by a final score of 20–9.

With the loss, the Bengals fell to 2–7–1.

In the 3rd quarter, quarterback Joe Burrow suffered a left leg injury and was carted off the field. In addition, it was revealed he had torn his ACL and MCL, with other damages to the PCL and meniscus and would be out for the remainder of the season.

==== Week 12: vs. New York Giants ====
Week 12: New York Giants at Cincinnati Bengals – Game summary

Quarter	1	2	3	4	Total
**Giants**	7	3	3	6	**19**
Bengals	7	3	0	7	**17**

at Paul Brown Stadium, Cincinnati, Ohio

- Date: November 29
- Game time: 1:00 pm. EST
- Game weather: Mostly cloudy, 52 °F (11 °C)
- Game attendance: 10,208
- Referee: Carl Cheffers
- TV announcers (Fox): Kevin Kugler, Chris Spielman and Laura Okmin
- Recap, Game Book

Game information

**First quarter**

- NYG – Wayne Gallman 1-yard run (Graham Gano kick), 10:01. Giants 7–0. **Drive: 9 plays, 76 yards, 4:59.**
- CIN – Brandon Wilson 103-yard kickoff return, 9:50. Tied 7–7

**Second quarter**

- CIN – Randy Bullock 44-yard field goal, 3:32. Bengals 10–7. **Drive: 9 plays, 29 yards, 5:08.**
- NYG – Graham Gano 49-yard field goal, 0:21. Tied 10–10. **Drive: 11 plays, 44 yards, 3:11.**

**Third quarter**

- NYG – Graham Gano 40-yard field goal, 8:06. Giants 13–10. **Drive: 11 plays, 72 yards, 5:10.**

**Fourth quarter**

- NYG – Graham Gano 39-yard field goal, 11:35. Giants 16–10. **Drive: 8 plays, 19 yards, 3:57.**
- NYG – Graham Gano 32-yard field goal, 3:54. Giants 19–10. **Drive: 4 plays, 5 yards, 0:18.**
- CIN – Tee Higgins 1-yard pass from Brandon Allen (Randy Bullock kick), 2:33. Giants 19–17. **Drive: 7 plays, 72 yards, 1:21.**

**Top passers**

- NYG – Daniel Jones – 16/27, 213 yards
- CIN – Brandon Allen – 17/29, 136 yards, TD, INT

**Top rushers**

- NYG – Wayne Gallman – 24 rushes, 94 yards, TD
- CIN – Giovani Bernard – 8 rushes, 32 yards

**Top receivers**

- NYG – Evan Engram – 6 receptions, 129 yards
- CIN – Tee Higgins – 5 receptions, 44 yards, TD

After another road loss, the Bengals then went back home for a game against the Giants. In the first quarter, the Giants drew first blood when Wayne Gallman ran for a 1-yard touchdown, making it 7–0. The Bengals were able to tie it up when Brandon Wilson returned the ensuing kickoff 103 yards for a touchdown to make the score 7–7. In the second quarter, the Bengals moved into the lead when Randy Bullock kicked a 44-yard field goal to make it 10–7. The Giants would tie it up at halftime with Graham Gano's 41-yard field goal, making it 10–10. In the third quarter, going into the fourth quarter, the Giants were able to make it 19–10 when Gano kicked 3 field goals from 40, 39, and 32 yards. Later on in the fourth, the Bengals came within 2 when Brandon Allen found Tee Higgins on a 1-yard touchdown pass, making it 19–17. With less than a minute left, the Bengals were able to get the offense back on the field. However, Allen would be sacked and he fumbled the ball, giving it back to the Giants, sealing yet another loss for the Bengals.

The Bengals recorded their first home loss to the Giants, ending a six-game home winning streak against them.

==== Week 13: at Miami Dolphins ====
Week 13: Cincinnati Bengals at Miami Dolphins – Game summary

Quarter	1	2	3	4	Total
Bengals	7	0	0	0	**7**
**Dolphins**	0	6	10	3	**19**

at Hard Rock Stadium, Miami Gardens, Florida

- Date: December 6
- Game time: 1:00 pm. EST
- Game weather: Mostly cloudy, 81 °F (27 °C)
- Game attendance: 12,577
- Referee: Ronald Torbert
- TV announcers (CBS): Andrew Catalon, James Lofton and AJ Ross
- Recap, Game Book

Game information

**First quarter**

- CIN – Tyler Boyd 72-yard pass from Brandon Allen (Randy Bullock kick), 3:31. Bengals 7–0. **Drive: 3 plays, 80 yards, 1:20.**

**Second quarter**

- MIA – Jason Sanders 25-yard field goal, 11:35. Bengals 7–3. **Drive: 10 plays, 68 yards, 6:38.**
- MIA – Jason Sanders 48-yard field goal, 0:02. Bengals 7–6. **Drive: 6 plays, 27 yards, 0:58.**

**Third quarter**

- MIA – Mike Gesicki 5-yard pass from Tua Tagovailoa (Jason Sanders kick), 11:35. Dolphins 13–7. **Drive: 8 plays, 75 yards, 3:25.**
- MIA – Jason Sanders 23-yard field goal, 5:37. Dolphins 16–7. **Drive: 10 plays, 70 yards, 4:10.**

**Fourth quarter**

- MIA – Jason Sanders 19-yard field goal, 13:24. Bengals 19–7. **Drive: 12 plays, 46 yards, 5:31.**

**Top passers**

- CIN – Brandon Allen – 11/19, 153 yards, TD, INT
- MIA – Tua Tagovailoa – 26/39, 296 yards, TD

**Top rushers**

- CIN – Giovani Bernard – 12 rushes, 30 yards
- MIA – Myles Gaskin – 21 rushes, 90 yards

**Top receivers**

- CIN – Tyler Boyd – 1 reception, 72 yards, TD
- MIA – Mike Gesicki – 9 receptions, 88 yards, TD

After a tough home loss, the Bengals traveled to take on the Dolphins. They would take a 7–0 lead for the first quarter's only score when Brandon Allen found Tyler Boyd on a 72-yard touchdown pass. However, from the second quarter on wards, the Dolphins would score the remaining points to win 19–7.

With the loss, the Bengals fell to 2–9–1 and were eliminated from postseason contention. With the Ravens' win over the Cowboys on Tuesday Night, they are also assured to finish in last place in the AFC North for the third straight season.

==== Week 14: vs. Dallas Cowboys ====
Week 14: Dallas Cowboys at Cincinnati Bengals – Game summary

Quarter	1	2	3	4	Total
**Cowboys**	10	7	3	10	**30**
Bengals	0	7	0	0	**7**

at Paul Brown Stadium, Cincinnati, Ohio

- Date: December 13
- Game time: 1:00 pm. EST
- Game weather: Cloudy, 44 °F (7 °C)
- Game attendance: 10,322
- Referee: John Hussey
- TV announcers (Fox): Kevin Kugler, Chris Spielman and Laura Okmin
- Recap, Game Book

Game information

**First quarter**

- DAL – Greg Zuerlein 34-yard field goal, 11:02. Cowboys 3–0. **Drive: 7 plays, 16 yards, 3:20.**
- DAL – Aldon Smith 78-yard fumble return (Greg Zuerlein kick), 6:15. Cowboys 10–0.

**Second quarter**

- DAL – Amari Cooper 11-yard pass from Andy Dalton (Greg Zuerlein kick), 6:38. Cowboys 17–0. **Drive: 15 plays, 88 yards, 8:12.**
- CIN – A. J. Green 5-yard pass from Brandon Allen (Austin Seibert kick), 0:08. Cowboys 17–7. **Drive: 16 plays, 77 yards, 6:30.**

**Third quarter**

- DAL – Greg Zuerlein 20-yard field goal, 11:35. Cowboys 20–7. **Drive: 8 plays, 41 yards, 3:25.**

**Fourth quarter**

- DAL – Greg Zuerlein 55-yard field goal, 5:12. Cowboys 23–7. **Drive: 7 plays, 53 yards, 2:11.**
- DAL – Tony Pollard 7-yard pass from Andy Dalton (Greg Zuerlein kick), 1:55. Cowboys 30–7. **Drive: 4 plays, 16 yards, 1:42.**

**Top passers**

- DAL – Andy Dalton – 16/23, 185 yards, 2 TD
- CIN – Brandon Allen – 27/36, 217 yards, TD

**Top rushers**

- DAL – Ezekiel Elliott – 12 rushes, 48 yards
- CIN – Trayveon Williams – 12 rushes, 49 yards

**Top receivers**

- DAL – Amari Cooper – 4 receptions, 51 yards, TD
- CIN – A. J. Green – 6 receptions, 62 yards, TD

After another loss on the road, the Bengals returned home to face against the Cowboys and former Bengals QB Andy Dalton. The Cowboys jumped out to a 17–0 well into the second quarter. But the Bengals managed to put up a touchdown of their own, thanks to Brandon Allen finding A. J. Green on a 5-yard pass before halftime to make it 17–7. From the third quarter onward, it would be all Cowboys scoring from there on out, making the final score 30–7.

With the loss, the Bengals fell to 2–10–1.

==== Week 15: vs. Pittsburgh Steelers ====
Week 15: Pittsburgh Steelers at Cincinnati Bengals – Game summary

Quarter	1	2	3	4	Total
Steelers	0	0	10	7	**17**
**Bengals**	3	14	0	10	**27**

at Paul Brown Stadium, Cincinnati, Ohio

- Date: December 21
- Game time: 8:15 pm. EST
- Game weather: Cloudy, 43 °F (6 °C)
- Game attendance: 10,249
- Referee: John Hussey
- TV announcers (ESPN): Steve Levy, Brian Griese, Louis Riddick and John Parry
- Recap, Game Book

Game information

**First quarter**

- CIN – Austin Seibert 34-yard field goal, 5:12. Bengals 3–0. **Drive: 6 plays, 4 yards, 4:04.**

**Second quarter**

- CIN – Giovani Bernard 4-yard run (Austin Seibert kick), 12:05. Bengals 10–0. **Drive: 7 plays, 38 yards, 3:44.**
- CIN – Giovani Bernard 14-yard pass from Ryan Finley (Austin Seibert kick), 4:20. Bengals 17–0. **Drive: 3 plays, 26 yards, 1:32.**

**Third quarter**

- PIT – Diontae Johnson 23-yard pass from Ben Roethlisberger (Chris Boswell kick), 12:07. Bengals 17–7. **Drive: 4 plays, 67 yards, 1:27.**
- PIT – Chris Boswell 25-yard field goal, 5:27. Bengals 17–10. **Drive: 10 plays, 67 yards, 5:00.**

**Fourth quarter**

- CIN – Ryan Finley 23-yard run (Austin Seibert kick), 11:21. Bengals 24–10. **Drive: 9 plays, 80 yards, 5:54.**
- PIT – Benny Snell 1-yard run (Chris Boswell kick), 5:32. Bengals 24–17. **Drive: 12 plays, 75 yards, 5:49.**
- CIN – Austin Seibert 33-yard field goal, 0:12. Bengals 27–17. **Drive: 4 plays, 9 yards, 1:40.**

**Top passers**

- PIT – Ben Roethlisberger – 20/38, 170 yards, TD, INT
- CIN – Ryan Finley – 7/13, 89 yards, TD

**Top rushers**

- PIT – Benny Snell – 18 rushes, 84 yards, TD
- CIN – Giovani Bernard – 25 rushes, 83 yards, TD

**Top receivers**

- PIT – Diontae Johnson – 8 receptions, 59 yards, TD
- CIN – A. J. Green – 2 receptions, 40 yards

The Bengals salvaged a bright spot from a dismal 2020 by pulling off their first win over the Steelers since 2015. Their first score came after Ben Roethlisberger botched a snap in the first quarter at his 19; the ensuing Bengals drive ended in a short field goal. A missed second field goal attempt by the Bengals was followed by a JuJu Smith-Schuster fumble forced by Vonn Bell. The Bengals led 17–0 at the half and added a third touchdown and late field goal for the 27–17 win.

With the upset win, the Bengals improved to 3–10–1 and snapped an 11-game losing streak to the Steelers which dates back to Week 8 of the 2015 season. They also beat the Steelers at home for the first time since Week 2 of the 2013 season.

==== Week 16: at Houston Texans ====
Week 16: Cincinnati Bengals at Houston Texans – Game summary

Quarter	1	2	3	4	Total
**Bengals**	7	3	14	13	**37**
Texans	3	7	14	7	**31**

at NRG Stadium, Houston, Texas

- Date: December 27
- Game time: 1:00 pm. EST/12:00 p.m. CST
- Game weather: None (retractable roof closed)
- Game attendance: 12,344
- Referee: Brad Rogers
- TV announcers (Fox): Chris Myers, Greg Jennings and Jen Hale
- Recap, Game Book

Game information

**First quarter**

- CIN – Drew Sample 8-yard pass from Brandon Allen (Austin Seibert kick), 8:32. Bengals 7–0. **Drive: 8 plays, 71 yards, 4:56.**
- HOU – Kaʻimi Fairbairn 21-yard field goal, 1:12. Bengals 7–3. **Drive: 5 plays, 54 yards, 2:11.**

**Second quarter**

- CIN – Austin Seibert 35-yard field goal, 3:30. Bengals 10–3. **Drive: 9 plays, 74 yards, 4:09.**
- HOU – Brandin Cooks 25-yard pass from Deshaun Watson (Kaʻimi Fairbairn kick), 1:54. Tied 10–10. **Drive: 5 plays, 75 yards, 1:36.**

**Third quarter**

- CIN – Samaje Perine 46-yard run (Austin Seibert kick), 12:59. Bengals 17–10. **Drive: 4 plays, 75 yards, 2:01.**
- HOU – David Johnson 4-yard run (Kaʻimi Fairbairn kick), 9:05. Tied 17–17. **Drive: 7 plays, 75 yards, 3:54.**
- CIN – Tee Higgins 20-yard pass from Brandon Allen (Austin Seibert kick), 5:46. Bengals 24–17. **Drive: 5 plays, 75 yards, 3:19.**
- HOU – David Johnson 2-yard pass from Deshaun Watson (Kaʻimi Fairbairn kick), 0:55. Tied 24–24. **Drive: 8 plays, 75 yards, 4:51.**

**Fourth quarter**

- CIN – Austin Seibert 48-yard field goal, 10:35. Bengals 27–24. **Drive: 11 plays, 60 yards, 5:20.**
- HOU – Darren Fells 22-yard pass from Deshaun Watson (Kaʻimi Fairbairn kick), 6:15. Texans 31–27. **Drive: 7 plays, 78 yards, 4:20.**
- CIN – Samaje Perine 3-yard run (Austin Seibert kick), 1:57. Bengals 34–31. **Drive: 10 plays, 75 yards, 4:18.**
- CIN – Austin Seibert 36-yard field goal, 0:18. Bengals 37–31. **Drive: 5 plays, 20 yards, 1:10.**

**Top passers**

- CIN – Brandon Allen – 29/37, 371 yards, 2 TD
- HOU – Deshaun Watson – 24/33, 324 yards, 3 TD

**Top rushers**

- CIN – Samaje Perine – 13 rushes, 95 yards, 2 TD
- HOU – David Johnson – 12 rushes, 128 yards, TD

**Top receivers**

- CIN – Tee Higgins – 6 receptions, 99 yards, TD
- HOU – Brandin Cooks – 7 receptions, 141 yards, TD

After a win at home, the Bengals then traveled to take on the Texans. The Bengals scored first when Drew Sample caught an 8-yard TD pass from Brandon Allen to make it 7–0. The Texans responded coming within 4 when Ka'imi Fairbairn kicked a 21-yard field goal to make it 7–3. The Bengals increased their lead to 7 when Austin Seibert kicked a 35-yard field goal to make it 10–3. Though, the Texans would tie it up when Brandin Cooks caught a 25-yard TD pass from DeShaun Watson, making it 10–10 at halftime. In the third quarter, the Bengals took the lead when Samaje Perine ran for a 46-yard TD to make it 17–10. Though, the Texans tied it up at 17-17 when David Johnson ran for a 4-yard TD. The Bengals moved back into the lead when Allen found Tee Higgins on a 20-yard TD pass, making it 24–17. However, the Texans closed out the quarter tying the game at 24-24 when Johnson caught a 2-yard TD pass from Watson. In the fourth quarter, the Bengals moved back into the lead when Seibert kicked a 48-yard field goal, making it 27–24. However, the Texans were able to take the lead when Watson found Darren Fells on a 22-yard TD pass, making the score 31–27. Later on in the quarter, the Bengals took the lead late with Perine's 3-yard TD run to make it 34–31, followed up by Seibert's last field goal of the day from 36 yards out to make the final score 37–31.

With the win, the Bengals improved to 4–10–1 and earned their first road win since Week 4 of the 2018 season, ending a 20-game road winless streak (0–19–1). In addition, Cincinnati posted back-to-back victories for the first time since Weeks 4 and 5 of that same season. This also marked the Bengals' first win over the Texans since 2014 and just their second since 2008.

==== Week 17: vs. Baltimore Ravens ====
Week 17: Baltimore Ravens at Cincinnati Bengals – Game summary

Quarter	1	2	3	4	Total
**Ravens**	10	7	21	0	**38**
Bengals	0	3	0	0	**3**

at Paul Brown Stadium, Cincinnati, Ohio

- Date: January 3
- Game time: 1:00 pm. EST
- Game weather: Cloudy, 39 °F (4 °C)
- Game attendance: 10,499
- Referee: Land Clark
- TV announcers (CBS): Spero Dedes, Adam Archuleta
- Recap, Game Book

Game information

**First quarter**

- BAL – Justin Tucker 34-yard field goal, 8:08. Ravens 3–0. **Drive: 12 plays, 59 yards, 6:52.**
- BAL – Miles Boykin 43-yard pass from Lamar Jackson (Justin Tucker kick), 3:48. Ravens 10–0. **Drive: 6 plays, 69 yards, 2:52.**

**Second quarter**

- BAL – Marquise Brown 18-yard pass from Lamar Jackson (Justin Tucker kick), 4:26. Ravens 17–0. **Drive: 17 plays, 93 yards, 8:39.**
- CIN – Austin Seibert 38-yard field goal, 0:32. Ravens 17–3. **Drive: 8 plays, 55 yards, 3:54.**

**Third quarter**

- BAL – J. K. Dobbins 4-yard run (Justin Tucker kick), 9:55. Ravens 24–3. **Drive: 5 plays, 70 yards, 2:40.**
- BAL – Marquise Brown 9-yard pass from Lamar Jackson (Justin Tucker kick), 3:44. Ravens 31–3. **Drive: 10 plays, 50 yards, 5:10.**
- BAL – J. K. Dobbins 72-yard run (Justin Tucker kick), 1:45. Ravens 38–3. **Drive: 2 plays, 80 yards, 0:53.**

**Fourth quarter**

- No scoring plays.

**Top passers**

- BAL – Lamar Jackson – 10/18, 113 yards, 3 TD, INT
- CIN – Brandon Allen – 6/21, 48 yards, 2 INT

**Top rushers**

- BAL – J. K. Dobbins – 13 rushes, 160 yards, 2 TD
- CIN – Trayveon Williams – 4 rushes, 74 yards

**Top receivers**

- BAL – Miles Boykin – 1 reception, 43 yards, TD
- CIN – Cethan Carter – 1 reception, 21 yards

The Bengals attempted to play the role of spoiler and possibly deny the Ravens of a playoff spot, but were instead blown out 38–3, failing to post their first three-game winning streak since 2015.

With the loss, the Bengals finished their season with a record of 4-11-1.

=== Standings ===
==== Division ====
AFC North
	W	L	T	PCT	DIV	CONF	PF	PA	STK
^{(3)} Pittsburgh Steelers	12	4	0	.750	4–2	9–3	416	312	L1
^{(5)} Baltimore Ravens	11	5	0	.688	4–2	7–5	468	303	W5
^{(6)} Cleveland Browns	11	5	0	.688	3–3	7–5	408	419	W1
Cincinnati Bengals	4	11	1	.281	1–5	4–8	311	424	L1

==== Conference ====
AFC
#	Team	Division	W	L	T	PCT	DIV	CONF	SOS	SOV	STK
**Division leaders**
1	Kansas City Chiefs	West	14	2	0	.875	4–2	10–2	.465	.464	L1
2	Buffalo Bills	East	13	3	0	.813	6–0	10–2	.512	.471	W6
3	Pittsburgh Steelers	North	12	4	0	.750	4–2	9–3	.475	.448	L1
4 (Note: Tennessee finished ahead of Indianapolis in the AFC South based on division record.)	Tennessee Titans	South	11	5	0	.688	5–1	8–4	.475	.398	W1
**Wild cards**
5 (Note: Baltimore claimed the No. 5 seed over Indianapolis based on head-to-head victory. Division tiebreaker used to eliminate Cleveland (see below).) (Note: Baltimore claimed the No. 5 seed over Cleveland based on head-to-head sweep.)	Baltimore Ravens	North	11	5	0	.688	4–2	7–5	.494	.401	W5
6 (Note: Cleveland claimed the No. 6 seed over Indianapolis based on head-to-head victory.)	Cleveland Browns	North	11	5	0	.688	3–3	7–5	.451	.406	W1
7	Indianapolis Colts	South	11	5	0	.688	4–2	7–5	.443	.384	W1
**Did not qualify for the postseason**
8	Miami Dolphins	East	10	6	0	.625	3–3	7–5	.467	.347	L1
9	Las Vegas Raiders	West	8	8	0	.500	4–2	6–6	.539	.477	W1
10 (Note: New England finished ahead of the LA Chargers based on head-to-head victory.)	New England Patriots	East	7	9	0	.438	3–3	6–6	.527	.429	W1
11	Los Angeles Chargers	West	7	9	0	.438	3–3	6–6	.482	.344	W4
12	Denver Broncos	West	5	11	0	.313	1–5	4–8	.566	.388	L3
13	Cincinnati Bengals	North	4	11	1	.281	1–5	4–8	.529	.438	L1
14	Houston Texans	South	4	12	0	.250	2–4	3–9	.541	.219	L5
15	New York Jets	East	2	14	0	.125	0–6	1–11	.594	.656	L1
16	Jacksonville Jaguars	South	1	15	0	.063	1–5	1–11	.549	.688	L15
**Tiebreakers** (Note: When breaking ties for three or more teams under the NFL's rules, they are first broken within divisions, then comparing only the highest ranked remaining team from each division.)
