= Daimion Stafford =

American football player (born 1991)

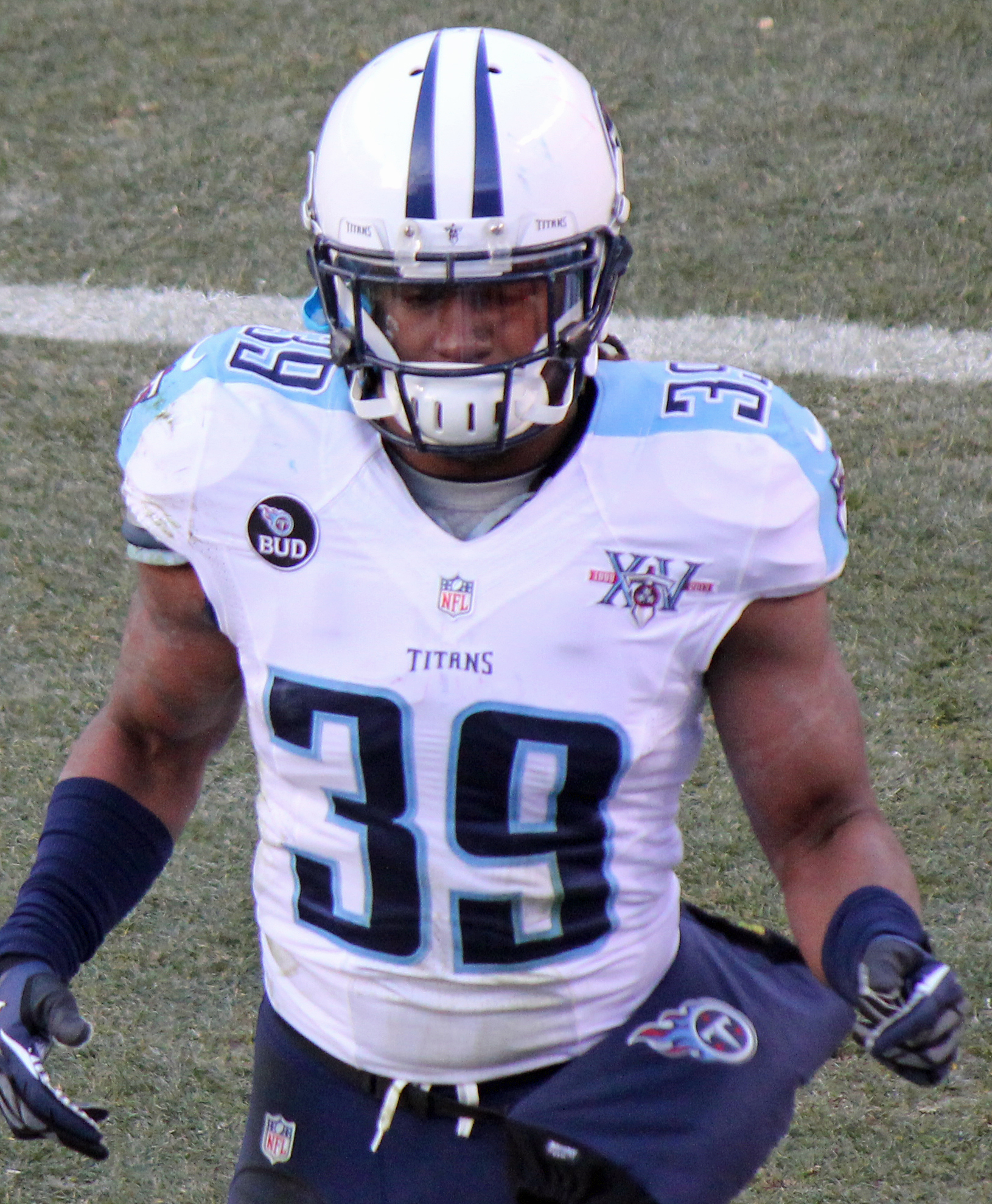
- Stafford with the Tennessee Titans in 2013

No. 39, 24
- Position: Safety

Personal information
- Born: February 18, 1991 (age 35); Riverside, California, U.S.
- Listed height: 6 ft 0 in (1.83 m)
- Listed weight: 221 lb (100 kg)

Career information
- High school: Norco (Norco, California)
- College: Nebraska
- NFL draft: 2013: 7th round, 248th overall pick

Career history
- Tennessee Titans (2013–2016); Pittsburgh Steelers (2017–2018)

Awards and highlights
- First-team All-Big Ten (2012)

Career NFL statistics
- Total Tackles: 117
- Sacks: 3
- Forced fumbles: 1
- Fumble recoveries: 2
- Interceptions: 2
- Stats at Pro Football Reference

Daimion Jerome Stafford (born February 18, 1991) is an American former professional football player who was a safety in the National Football League (NFL). He played college football for the Nebraska Cornhuskers and was selected by the Tennessee Titans in the seventh round of the 2013 NFL draft.

== Early life ==
Stafford attended Norco High School. He was ranked among the top 20 best overall junior college football prospects by Rivals.com and Scout.com.

== Professional career ==
Pre-draft measurables
Height	Weight	Arm length	Hand span	Wingspan	40-yard dash	10-yard split	20-yard split	20-yard shuttle	Three-cone drill	Vertical jump	Broad jump	Bench press
5 ft 11 5/8 in (1.82 m)	221 lb (100 kg)	31 1/8 in (0.79 m)	9 1/4 in (0.23 m)	6 ft 2 in (1.88 m)	4.56 s	1.62 s	2.59 s	4.26 s	7.06 s	33.5 in (0.85 m)	9 ft 9 in (2.97 m)	21 reps
All values from NFL Combine/Pro Day

=== Tennessee Titans ===
Stafford was selected by the Tennessee Titans in the seventh round with the 248th overall pick in the 2013 NFL draft.

=== Pittsburgh Steelers ===
On May 30, 2017, Stafford signed with the Pittsburgh Steelers.

On July 27, 2017, the Pittsburgh Steelers placed Stafford on their reserve/did not report list after he didn't show up for training camp and was reportedly considering retirement. He was released from the reserve/did not report list on May 9, 2019.
