= 2023 Cincinnati Bengals season =

56th season in franchise history

- Owner: Mike Brown
- Head coach: Zac Taylor
- Home stadium: Paycor Stadium

Results
- Record: 9–8
- Division place: 4th AFC North
- Playoffs: Did not qualify
- Pro Bowlers: WR Ja'Marr Chase; DE Trey Hendrickson

Uniform
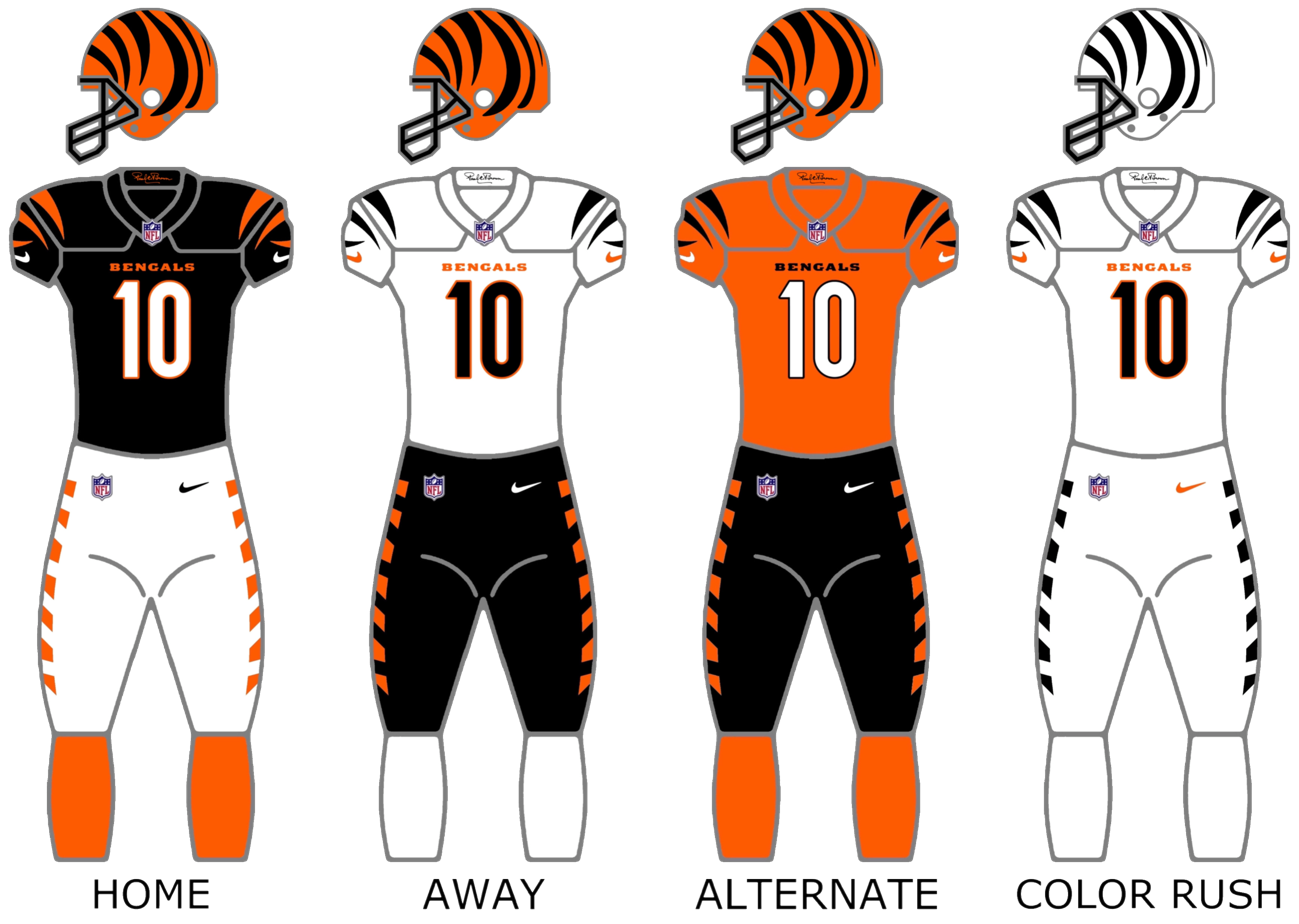

The 2023 season was the Cincinnati Bengals' 54th season in the National Football League (NFL), their 56th overall and their fifth under head coach Zac Taylor. The Bengals failed to match their 12–4 record from 2022 after a 34–20 loss to the Baltimore Ravens in week 11. With a Week 17 loss to the Kansas City Chiefs, coupled with wins by the Pittsburgh Steelers and Buffalo Bills earlier in the day, the Bengals were eliminated from playoff contention for the first time since 2020.

Already struggling to a 5–4 start, the Bengals were dealt a critical blow in week 11 when they lost franchise quarterback Joe Burrow for the season to a wrist injury. Despite this, backup Jake Browning managed to perform above expectations, as the team went 8–6 and were still in the playoff picture. However, back to back losses to the Steelers and Chiefs kept the Bengals out of the playoff picture. This was the first season since 2008 that Kevin Huber was not on the roster, as he announced his retirement on July 7.

A 31–14 home win over the Browns to end the season gave the Bengals their 9th win of the season, meaning that every team in the AFC North finished above .500, the first time a division in the NFL had done this since 1935.

The Cincinnati Bengals drew an average home attendance of 66,040 in 9 home games in the 2023 NFL season.

== Offseason ==
=== Free agents ===
As of March 14, 2023

==== Unrestricted ====
Position	Player	2023 Team	Date signed	Contract
S	Jessie Bates III	Atlanta Falcons	March 13	4 years, $64 million
S	Vonn Bell	Carolina Panthers	March 13	3 years, $22.5 million
CB	Eli Apple	Miami Dolphins	July 29	1 year, $1.6 million
TE	Hayden Hurst	Carolina Panthers	March 15	3 years, $21.75 million
CB	Tre Flowers	Atlanta Falcons	May 8	1 year, $1.232 million
RB	Samaje Perine	Denver Broncos	March 14	2 years, $7.5 million
QB	Brandon Allen	San Francisco 49ers	May 3	1 year, $1.232 million
TE	Drew Sample	Cincinnati Bengals	April 14	1 year, $1.232 million
LS	Clark Harris			
G	Max Scharping	Cincinnati Bengals	March 20	1 year, $1.28 million
S	Michael Thomas	Cincinnati Bengals	March 13	1 year, $1.165 million
WR	Trent Taylor	Cincinnati Bengals	March 27	1 year, $1.232 million
CB	Jalen Davis	Cincinnati Bengals	March 9	2 years, $2.43 million
LB	Germaine Pratt	Cincinnati Bengals	March 14	3 years, $20.25 million
CB	Chris Lammons	Indianapolis Colts	July 27	1 year, $1.01 million
RB	Trayveon Williams	Cincinnati Bengals	March 16	1 year, $1.232 million

==== Restricted ====
Position	Player	2023 Team	Date signed	Contract
LB	Joe Bachie	Cincinnati Bengals	March 9	1 year, $1.16 million

==== Exclusive rights ====
Position	Player	2023 Team	Date signed	Contract
LS	Cal Adomitis	Cincinnati Bengals	February 22	1 year, $870k
LB	Clay Johnston			
TE	Mitchell Wilcox	Cincinnati Bengals	July 24	1 year, $1.04 million

=== Signings ===
Position	Player	2022 Team	Date signed	Contract
G	Cody Ford	Arizona Cardinals	March 16	1 year, $1.08 million
OT	Orlando Brown Jr.	Kansas City Chiefs	March 17	4 years, $64.09 million
S	Nick Scott	Los Angeles Rams	March 20	3 years, $12 million
CB	Sidney Jones	Las Vegas Raiders	March 27	1 year, $1.13 million
TE	Irv Smith Jr.	Minnesota Vikings	March 28	1 year, $1.75 million
DE	Tarell Basham	Tennessee Titans	March 31	1 year, $1.131 million
QB	Trevor Siemian	Chicago Bears	May 3	1 year, $1.317 million
QB	Reid Sinnett	San Antonio Brahmas (XFL)	July 30	1 year, $870K

== Draft ==
2023 Cincinnati Bengals draft selections
Round	Selection	Player	Position	College	Notes
1	28	Myles Murphy	DE	Clemson	
2	60	DJ Turner	CB	Michigan	
3	92	Traded to the Kansas City Chiefs (Note: The Bengals traded a third-round selection (92nd overall) to the Kansas City Chiefs in exchange for third- and sixth-round selections (95th and 217th overall).)			
3	95	Jordan Battle	S	Alabama	From Chiefs
4	131	Charlie Jones	WR	Purdue	
5	163	Chase Brown	RB	Illinois	
6	206	Andrei Iosivas	WR	Princeton	
6	217	Brad Robbins	P	Michigan	From Chiefs
7	246	D. J. Ivey	CB	Miami (FL)	

2023 Cincinnati Bengals undrafted free agents
Name	Position	College	Ref.
Larry Brooks	S	Tulane	
Malachi Carter	WR	Georgia Tech	
Shaka Heyward	LB	Duke	
Mac Hippenhammer	WR	Miami (OH)	
Shedrick Jackson	WR	Auburn	
Jaxson Kirkland	G	Washington	
Devonnsha Maxwell	DT	Chattanooga	
Jaylen Moody	LB	Alabama	
Tyler Murray	LB	Memphis	
Tautala Pesefea	DT	Arizona State	
Jacob Saylors	RB	E. Tennessee	
Christian Trahan	TE	Houston	
Calvin Tyler Jr.	RB	Kentucky	

Draft trades

== Staff ==
2023 Cincinnati Bengals staff
Front office: Owner/president – Mike Brown; Executive vice president – Katie Blackburn; Vice president – Troy Blackburn; Vice president of player personnel – Paul H. Brown; Director of player personnel – Duke Tobin; Senior personnel executive – Trey Brown; College scouting director – Mike Potts; Pro scouting director – Steven Radicivec; Head coaches: Head coach – Zac Taylor; Assistant head coach/special teams coordinator – Darrin Simmons; Offensive coaches: Offensive coordinator – Brian Callahan; Quarterbacks – Dan Pitcher; Assistant quarterbacks – Brad Kragthorpe; Running backs – Justin Hill; Wide receivers – Troy Walters; Tight ends – James Casey; Offensive line/run game coordinator – Frank Pollack; Assistant offensive line – Derek Frazier; Offensive Assistant – Fredi Knighten	Defensive coaches: Defensive coordinator – Lou Anarumo; Defensive line – Marion Hobby; Linebackers – James Bettcher; Assistant linebackers – Jordan Kovacs; Secondary/cornerbacks – Charles Burks; Secondary/safeties – Robert Livingston; Senior defensive assistant – Mark Duffner; Defensive quality control – Louie Cioffi; Special teams coaches: Assistant special teams – Colt Anderson; Strength and conditioning: Strength and conditioning – Joey Boese; Assistant strength and conditioning – Todd Hunt; Assistant strength and conditioning – Garrett Swanson

== Final roster ==
2023 Cincinnati Bengals roster
Quarterbacks (QB): 6 Jake Browning; 4 A. J. McCarron; Running backs (RB): 30 Chase Brown; 25 Chris Evans; 28 Joe Mixon; 32 Trayveon Williams; Wide receivers (WR): 83 Tyler Boyd; 1 Ja'Marr Chase; 5 Tee Higgins; 80 Andrei Iosivas; 16 Trenton Irwin; 15 Charlie Jones; Tight ends (TE): 87 Tanner Hudson; 89 Drew Sample; 81 Irv Smith Jr.; 84 Mitchell Wilcox	Offensive linemen (OL): 75 Orlando Brown T; 65 Alex Cappa G; 79 Jackson Carman T; 61 Cody Ford G; 63 Trey Hill C/G; 64 Ted Karras C; 74 Max Scharping G; 70 D'Ante Smith T; 67 Cordell Volson G; 73 Jonah Williams T; Defensive linemen (DL): 90 Travis Bell DT; 95 Zachary Carter DT; 91 Trey Hendrickson DE; 92 B. J. Hill DT; 94 Sam Hubbard DE; 99 Myles Murphy DE; 58 Joseph Ossai DE; 96 Cameron Sample DE; 97 Jay Tufele DT; 68 Josh Tupou DT	Linebackers (LB): 49 Joe Bachie MLB; 51 Markus Bailey MLB; 59 Akeem Davis-Gaither OLB; 56 Devin Harper OLB; 57 Germaine Pratt OLB; 55 Logan Wilson OLB; Defensive backs (DB): 22 Chidobe Awuzie CB; 27 Jordan Battle SS; 35 Jalen Davis CB; 23 Daxton Hill FS; 21 Mike Hilton CB; 33 Nick Scott SS; 29 Cam Taylor-Britt CB; 20 DJ Turner CB; Special teams (ST): 48 Cal Adomitis LS; 4 Drue Chrisman P; 2 Evan McPherson K	Practice squad: 72 Domenique Davis DT; 34 Demetric Felton RB; 42 Allan George CB; 66 Nate Gilliam G/C; 93 Jeffrey Gunter DE; 50 Shaka Heyward MLB; 12 Shedrick Jackson WR; 44 Clay Johnston OLB; 24 Sidney Jones CB; 60 Jaxson Kirkland G (PS/I); 18 Kwamie Lassiter II WR; 17 Stanley Morgan Jr. WR; 7 Drew Plitt QB; 19 Kendric Pryor WR; 31 Michael Thomas FS; Reserve: 26 Tycen Anderson CB (IR); 9 Joe Burrow QB (IR); 76 Devin Cochran T (IR); 38 D. J. Ivey CB (IR); 69 Devonnsha Maxwell DT (IR); 98 D. J. Reader DT (IR); Rookies in italics 53 active, 6 reserve, 14 practice squad (1 exempt)

== Preseason ==
Week	Date	Opponent	Result	Record	Venue	Recap
1	August 11	Green Bay Packers	L 19–36	0–1	Paycor Stadium	Recap
2	August 18	at Atlanta Falcons	T 13–13	0–1–1	Mercedes-Benz Stadium	Recap
3	August 26	at Washington Commanders	L 19–21	0–2–1	Fedex Field	Recap

== Regular season ==
=== Schedule ===
Week	Date	Opponent	Result	Record	Venue	Recap
1	September 10	at **Cleveland Browns**	**L** 3–24	0–1	Cleveland Browns Stadium	Recap
2	September 17	**Baltimore Ravens**	**L** 24–27	0–2	Paycor Stadium	Recap
3	September 25	Los Angeles Rams	**W** 19–16	1–2	Paycor Stadium	Recap
4	October 1	at Tennessee Titans	**L** 3–27	1–3	Nissan Stadium	Recap
5	October 8	at Arizona Cardinals	**W** 34–20	2–3	State Farm Stadium	Recap
6	October 15	Seattle Seahawks	**W** 17–13	3–3	Paycor Stadium	Recap
7	Bye					
8	October 29	at San Francisco 49ers	**W** 31–17	4–3	Levi's Stadium	Recap
9	November 5	Buffalo Bills	**W** 24–18	5–3	Paycor Stadium	Recap
10	November 12	Houston Texans	**L** 27–30	5–4	Paycor Stadium	Recap
11	November 16	at **Baltimore Ravens**	**L** 20–34	5–5	M&T Bank Stadium	Recap
12	November 26	**Pittsburgh Steelers**	**L** 10–16	5–6	Paycor Stadium	Recap
13	December 4	at Jacksonville Jaguars	**W** 34–31 (OT)	6–6	EverBank Stadium	Recap
14	December 10	Indianapolis Colts	**W** 34–14	7–6	Paycor Stadium	Recap
15	December 16	Minnesota Vikings	**W** 27–24 (OT)	8–6	Paycor Stadium	Recap
16	December 23	at **Pittsburgh Steelers**	**L** 11–34	8–7	Acrisure Stadium	Recap
17	December 31	at Kansas City Chiefs	**L** 17–25	8–8	Arrowhead Stadium	Recap
18	January 7	**Cleveland Browns**	**W** 31–14	9–8	Paycor Stadium	Recap

Note: Intra-division opponents are in bold text.

=== Game summaries ===
==== Week 1: at Cleveland Browns ====
Week 1: Cincinnati Bengals at Cleveland Browns – Game summary

Quarter	1	2	3	4	Total
Bengals	0	0	3	0	**3**
**Browns**	0	10	3	11	**24**

at Cleveland Browns Stadium, Cleveland, Ohio

- Date: September 10
- Game time: 1:00 p.m. EDT
- Game weather: Cloudy, 68 °F (20 °C)
- Game attendance: 67,919
- Referee: Clete Blakeman
- TV announcers (CBS): Ian Eagle, Charles Davis and Evan Washburn
- Recap, Game Book

Game information

**First quarter**

- No scoring plays.

**Second quarter**

- CLE – Dustin Hopkins 42-yard field goal, 14:15. Browns 3–0. **Drive: 7 plays, 33 yards, 2:54.**
- CLE – Deshaun Watson 13-yard run (Dustin Hopkins kick), 0:17. Browns 10–0. **Drive: 9 plays, 67 yards, 1:19.**

**Third quarter**

- CIN – Evan McPherson 42-yard field goal, 11:44. Browns 10–3. **Drive: 6 plays, 30 yards, 1:46.**
- CLE – Dustin Hopkins 34-yard field goal, 2:21. Browns 13–3. **Drive: 9 plays, 43 yards, 4:32.**

**Fourth quarter**

- CLE – Dustin Hopkins 43-yard field goal, 11:29. Browns 16–3. **Drive: 6 plays, 39 yards, 3:25.**
- CLE – Harrison Bryant 3-yard pass from Deshaun Watson (Deshaun Watson run), 9:11. Browns 24–3. **Drive: 3 plays, 18 yards, 1:16.**

**Top passers**

- CIN – Joe Burrow – 14/31, 82 yards
- CLE – Deshaun Watson – 16/29, 154 yards, TD, INT

**Top rushers**

- CIN – Joe Mixon – 13 rushes, 56 yards
- CLE – Nick Chubb – 18 rushes, 106 yards

**Top receivers**

- CIN – Ja'Marr Chase – 5 receptions, 39 yards
- CLE – Elijah Moore – 3 receptions, 43 yards

The Bengals opened the season on the road with an AFC North matchup against the in-state rival Cleveland Browns, marking the 100th meeting between the two franchises.

The Browns defense dominated the game, forcing ten Cincinnati punts including seven three-and-outs, and limiting the Bengals offense to six first downs. Quarterback Joe Burrow was limited to a career-low 82 passing yards. Joe Mixon led the Bengals' rushing attack with 13 carries for 56 yards. Defensively, the Bengals allowed Quarterback Deshaun Watson 154 passing yards, 45 rushing yards, a passing touchdown, and a rushing touchdown, a 55.2% completion percentage and one interception, and Nick Chubb's 106 rushing yards on 18 carries. Kicker Dustin Hopkins converted all three of his field goal attempts. The Bengals' lone score came on an Evan McPherson field goal, as he failed to connect on his second field goal attempt.

With the loss, the Bengals opened the season 0–1 for the second consecutive year.

==== Week 2: vs. Baltimore Ravens ====
Week 2: Baltimore Ravens at Cincinnati Bengals – Game summary

Quarter	1	2	3	4	Total
**Ravens**	7	6	7	7	**27**
Bengals	0	10	7	7	**24**

at Paycor Stadium, Cincinnati, Ohio

- Date: September 17
- Game time: 1:00 p.m. EDT
- Game weather: Cloudy, 72 °F (22 °C)
- Game attendance: 66,015
- Referee: Shawn Hochuli
- TV announcers (CBS): Andrew Catalon, Tiki Barber, Matt Ryan, and AJ Ross
- Recap, Game Book

Game information

**First quarter**

- BAL – Gus Edwards 1-yard run (Justin Tucker kick), 7:12. Ravens 7–0. **Drive: 13 plays, 75 yards, 7:48.**

**Second quarter**

- CIN – Charlie Jones 81-yard punt return (Evan McPherson kick), 13:14. Tied 7–7.
- BAL – Justin Tucker 44-yard field goal, 9:15. Ravens 10–7. **Drive: 10 plays, 49 yards, 3:59.**
- CIN – Evan McPherson 27-yard field goal, 3:01. Tied 10–10. **Drive: 12 plays, 66 yards, 6:14.**
- BAL – Justin Tucker 40-yard field goal, 0:00. Ravens 13–10. **Drive: 12 plays, 53 yards, 3:01.**

**Third quarter**

- BAL – Mark Andrews 3-yard pass from Lamar Jackson (Justin Tucker kick), 8:39. Ravens 20–10. **Drive: 4 plays, 62 yards, 2:00.**
- CIN – Tee Higgins 3-yard pass from Joe Burrow (Evan McPherson kick), 2:34. Ravens 20–17. **Drive: 13 plays, 75 yards, 6:05.**

**Fourth quarter**

- BAL – Nelson Agholor 17-yard pass from Lamar Jackson (Justin Tucker kick), 11:38. Ravens 27–17. **Drive: 12 plays, 75 yards, 5:56.**
- CIN – Tee Higgins 4-yard pass from Joe Burrow (Evan McPherson kick), 3:28. Ravens 27–24. **Drive: 16 plays, 80 yards, 4:12.**

**Top passers**

- BAL – Lamar Jackson – 24/33, 237 yards, 2 TD
- CIN – Joe Burrow – 27/41, 222 yards, 2 TD, INT

**Top rushers**

- BAL – Gus Edwards – 10 rushes, 62 yards, TD
- CIN – Joe Mixon – 13 rushes, 59 yards

**Top receivers**

- BAL – Nelson Agholor – 5 receptions, 63 yards, TD
- CIN – Tee Higgins – 8 receptions, 89 yards, 2 TD

The Bengals were upset at home against their division rival. With their second straight loss, the Bengals dropped to 0-2 for the second straight season. They were the only AFC North team without any victories following their game.

==== Week 3: vs. Los Angeles Rams ====
Week 3: Los Angeles Rams at Cincinnati Bengals – Game summary

Quarter	1	2	3	4	Total
Rams	3	3	3	7	**16**
**Bengals**	0	6	10	3	**19**

at Paycor Stadium, Cincinnati, Ohio

- Date: September 25
- Game time: 8:15 p.m. EDT
- Game weather: Mostly clear, 71 °F (22 °C)
- Game attendance: 65,158
- Referee: John Hussey
- TV announcers (WLWT/ESPN): Chris Fowler, Louis Riddick, Dan Orlovsky, and Laura Rutledge
- Recap, Game Book

Game information

**First quarter**

- LAR – Brett Maher 30-yard field goal, 8:22. Rams 3–0. **Drive: 8 plays, 43 yards, 3:04.**

**Second quarter**

- CIN – Evan McPherson 49-yard field goal, 12:55. Tied 3–3. **Drive: 12 plays, 48 yards, 6:27.**
- LAR – Brett Maher 23-yard field goal, 9:49. Rams 6–3. **Drive: 7 plays, 70 yards, 3:06.**
- CIN – Evan McPherson 53-yard field goal, 0:00. Tied 6–6. **Drive: 6 plays, 26 yards, 1:13.**

**Third quarter**

- LAR – Brett Maher 42-yard field goal, 10:37. Rams 9–6. **Drive: 7 plays, 51 yards, 4:23.**
- CIN – Joe Mixon 14-yard run (Evan McPherson kick), 5:34. Bengals 13–9. **Drive: 10 plays, 75 yards, 5:03.**
- CIN – Evan McPherson 48-yard field goal, 3:09. Bengals 16–9. **Drive: 6 plays, 48 yards, 1:48.**

**Fourth quarter**

- CIN – Evan McPherson 54-yard field goal, 7:13. Bengals 19–9. **Drive: 4 plays, 5 yards, 1:33.**
- LAR – Tutu Atwell 1-yard pass from Matthew Stafford (Brett Maher kick), 1:03. Bengals 19–16. **Drive: 10 plays, 61 yards, 2:31.**

**Top passers**

- LAR – Matthew Stafford – 18/33, 269 yards, TD, 2 INT
- CIN – Joe Burrow – 26/49, 259 yards, INT

**Top rushers**

- LAR – Kyren Williams – 10 rushes, 38 yards
- CIN – Joe Mixon – 19 rushes, 65 yards, TD

**Top receivers**

- LAR – Puka Nacua – 5 receptions, 72 yards
- CIN – Ja'Marr Chase – 12 receptions, 141 yards

In a rematch of Super Bowl LVI, the Bengals got revenge on the Rams, winning the game to get their first victory of the regular season.

==== Week 4: at Tennessee Titans ====
Week 4: Cincinnati Bengals at Tennessee Titans – Game summary

Quarter	1	2	3	4	Total
Bengals	3	0	0	0	**3**
**Titans**	3	21	3	0	**27**

at Nissan Stadium, Nashville, Tennessee

- Date: October 1
- Game time: 1:00 p.m. EDT/12:00 p.m. CDT
- Game weather: Sunny, 82 °F (28 °C)
- Game attendance: 68,951
- Referee: Shawn Smith
- TV announcers (Fox): Adam Amin, Mark Schlereth and Kristina Pink
- Recap, Game Book

Game information

**First quarter**

- CIN – Evan McPherson 21-yard field goal, 9:12. Bengals 3–0. **Drive: 11 plays, 72 yards, 5:48.**
- TEN – Nick Folk 53-yard field goal, 1:24. Tied 3–3. **Drive: 15 plays, 40 yards, 7:48.**

**Second quarter**

- TEN – Nick Westbrook-Ikhine 13-yard pass from Ryan Tannehill (Nick Folk kick), 6:31. Titans 10–3. **Drive: 5 plays, 78 yards, 2:54.**
- TEN – Derrick Henry 29-yard run (Nick Folk kick), 3:58. Titans 17-3. **Drive: 4 plays, 73 yards, 1:41.**
- TEN – Josh Whyle 2-yard pass from Derrick Henry (Nick Folk kick), 0:10. Titans 24-3. **Drive: 7 plays, 80 yards, 1:10.**

**Third quarter**

- TEN – Nick Folk 35-yard field goal, 4:38. Titans 27-3. **Drive: 15 plays, 65 yards, 10:22.**

**Fourth quarter**

- No scoring plays.

**Top passers**

- CIN – Joe Burrow – 20/30, 165 yards
- TEN – Ryan Tannehill – 18/25, 240 yards, TD, INT

**Top rushers**

- CIN – Joe Mixon – 14 rushes, 67 yards
- TEN – Derrick Henry – 22 rushes, 122 yards, TD

**Top receivers**

- CIN – Ja'Marr Chase – 7 receptions, 73 yards
- TEN – DeAndre Hopkins – 4 receptions, 63 yards

This would mark the first time Joe Burrow lost to the Titans, ending a 3-game winning streak (including playoffs) against the team. With the loss, the Bengals fell to 1–3.

==== Week 5: at Arizona Cardinals ====
Week 5: Cincinnati Bengals at Arizona Cardinals – Game summary

Quarter	1	2	3	4	Total
**Bengals**	10	7	7	10	**34**
Cardinals	0	14	6	0	**20**

at State Farm Stadium, Glendale, Arizona

- Date: October 8
- Game time: 4:05 p.m. EDT/1:05 p.m. MST
- Game weather: None (retractable roof closed)
- Game attendance: 62,651
- Referee: Clay Martin
- TV announcers (Fox): Kevin Kugler, Mark Sanchez and Laura Okmin
- Recap, Game Book

Game information

**First quarter**

- CIN – Ja'Marr Chase 2-yard pass from Joe Burrow (Evan McPherson kick), 7:09. Bengals 7–0. **Drive: 11 plays, 64 yards, 6:10.**
- CIN – Evan McPherson 40-yard field goal, 1:46. Bengals 10–0. **Drive: 8 plays, 26 yards, 4:05.**

**Second quarter**

- ARI – Marquise Brown 25-yard pass from Joshua Dobbs (Matt Prater kick), 12:25. Bengals 10–7. **Drive: 9 plays, 75 yards, 4:21.**
- ARI – Zach Ertz 4-yard pass from Joshua Dobbs (Matt Prater kick), 8:28. Cardinals 14–10. **Drive: 5 plays, 49 yards, 2:13.**
- CIN – Cam Taylor-Britt 11-yard interception return (Evan McPherson kick), 1:23. Bengals 17–14.

**Third quarter**

- CIN – Ja'Marr Chase 63-yard pass from Joe Burrow (Evan McPherson kick), 13:39. Bengals 24–14. **Drive: 3 plays, 75 yards, 1:21.**
- ARI – Emari Demercado 11-yard run (kick failed), 7:33. Bengals 24–20. **Drive: 11 plays, 75 yards, 6:06.**

**Fourth quarter**

- CIN – Ja'Marr Chase 3-yard pass from Joe Burrow (Evan McPherson kick), 7:48. Bengals 31–20. **Drive: 1 play, 83 yards, 8:55.**
- CIN – Evan McPherson 40-yard field goal, 6:33. Bengals 34–20. **Drive: 5 plays, 6 yards, 1:08.**

**Top passers**

- CIN – Joe Burrow – 36/46, 317 yards, 3 TD, INT
- ARI – Joshua Dobbs – 15/32, 166 yards, 2 TD, 2 INT

**Top rushers**

- CIN – Joe Mixon – 25 rushes, 81 yards
- ARI – Rondale Moore – 3 rushes, 50 yards

**Top receivers**

- CIN – Ja'Marr Chase – 15 receptions, 192 yards, 3 TD
- ARI – Marquise Brown – 4 receptions, 61 yards, TD

The Bengals recorded their first road win against the Cardinals.

==== Week 6: vs. Seattle Seahawks ====
Week 6: Seattle Seahawks at Cincinnati Bengals – Game summary

Quarter	1	2	3	4	Total
Seahawks	7	3	3	0	**13**
**Bengals**	7	7	0	3	**17**

at Paycor Stadium, Cincinnati, Ohio

- Date: October 15
- Game time: 1:00 p.m. EDT
- Game weather: Cloudy, 57 °F (14 °C)
- Game attendance: 66,385
- Referee: Adrian Hill
- TV announcers (CBS): Ian Eagle, Charles Davis and Evan Washburn
- Recap, Game Book

Game information

**First quarter**

- SEA – Kenneth Walker III 1-yard run (Jason Myers kick), 8:38. Seahawks 7–0. **Drive: 11 plays, 75 yards, 6:22.**
- CIN – Tyler Boyd 8-yard pass from Joe Burrow (Evan McPherson kick), 2:22. Tied 7–7. **Drive: 13 plays, 69 yards, 6:16.**

**Second quarter**

- CIN – Andrei Iosivas 3-yard pass from Joe Burrow (Evan McPherson kick), 12:20. Bengals 14–7. **Drive: 7 plays, 73 yards, 3:22.**
- SEA – Jason Myers 55-yard field goal, 0:43. Bengals 14–10. **Drive: 9 plays, 42 yards, 2:45.**

**Third quarter**

- SEA – Jason Myers 23-yard field goal, 2:24. Bengals 14–13. **Drive: 8 plays, 38 yards, 3:18.**

**Fourth quarter**

- CIN – Evan McPherson 52-yard field goal, 11:47. Bengals 17–13. **Drive: 4 plays, 0 yards, 0:16.**

**Top passers**

- SEA – Geno Smith – 27/41, 323 yards, 2 INT
- CIN – Joe Burrow – 24/35, 185 yards, 2 TD, INT

**Top rushers**

- SEA – Kenneth Walker III – 19 rushes, 62 yards, TD
- CIN – Joe Mixon – 12 rushes, 38 yards

**Top receivers**

- SEA – Tyler Lockett – 6 receptions, 94 yards
- CIN – Ja'Marr Chase – 6 receptions, 80 yards

==== Week 8: at San Francisco 49ers ====
Week 8: Cincinnati Bengals at San Francisco 49ers – Game summary

Quarter	1	2	3	4	Total
**Bengals**	14	0	3	14	**31**
49ers	7	3	0	7	**17**

at Levi's Stadium, Santa Clara, California

- Date: October 29
- Game time: 4:25 p.m. EDT/1:25 p.m. PDT
- Game weather: Sunny, 74 °F (23 °C)
- Game attendance: 71,655
- Referee: Ronald Torbert
- TV announcers (CBS): Jim Nantz, Tony Romo and Tracy Wolfson
- Recap, Game Book

Game information

**First quarter**

- CIN – Tyler Boyd 7-yard pass from Joe Burrow (Evan McPherson kick), 8:11. Bengals 7–0. **Drive: 10 plays, 85 yards, 4:38.**
- SF – Christian McCaffrey 2-yard run (Jake Moody kick), 3:19. Tied 7–7. **Drive: 8 plays, 75 yards, 4:52.**
- CIN – Andrei Iosivas 2-yard pass from Joe Burrow (Evan McPherson kick), 0:00. Bengals 14–7. **Drive: 6 plays, 58 yards, 3:19.**

**Second quarter**

- SF – Jake Moody 36-yard field goal, 2:44. Bengals 14–10. **Drive: 7 plays, 42 yards, 4:19.**

**Third quarter**

- CIN – Evan McPherson 56-yard field goal, 11:09. Bengals 17–10. **Drive: 7 plays, 37 yards, 3:51.**

**Fourth quarter**

- CIN – Ja'Marr Chase 17-yard pass from Joe Burrow (Evan McPherson kick), 13:04. Bengals 24–10. **Drive: 1 play, 17 yards, 0:04.**
- SF – Christian McCaffrey 4-yard pass from Brock Purdy (Jake Moody kick), 8:12. Bengals 24–17. **Drive: 10 plays, 75 yards, 4:52.**
- CIN – Joe Mixon 5-yard pass run (Evan McPherson kick), 2:54. Bengals 31–17. **Drive: 10 plays, 78 yards, 5:18.**

**Top passers**

- CIN – Joe Burrow – 28/32, 283 yards, 3 TD
- SF – Brock Purdy – 22/31, 365 yards, TD, 2 INT

**Top rushers**

- CIN – Joe Mixon – 16 rushes, 87 yards, TD
- SF – Brock Purdy – 6 rushes, 57 yards

**Top receivers**

- CIN – Ja'Marr Chase – 10 receptions, 100 yards, TD
- SF – George Kittle – 9 receptions, 149 yards

With the win, the Bengals improved to 4–3 and swept the NFC West.

==== Week 9: vs. Buffalo Bills ====
Week 9: Buffalo Bills at Cincinnati Bengals – Game summary

Quarter	1	2	3	4	Total
Bills	7	0	3	8	**18**
**Bengals**	14	7	0	3	**24**

at Paycor Stadium, Cincinnati, Ohio

- Date: November 5
- Game time: 8:20 p.m. EST
- Game weather: Mostly clear, 51 °F (11 °C)
- Game attendance: 66,965
- Referee: Alex Kemp
- TV announcers (NBC): Mike Tirico, Cris Collinsworth, and Melissa Stark
- Recap, Game Book

Game information

**First quarter**

- CIN – Irv Smith Jr. 7-yard pass from Joe Burrow (Evan McPherson kick), 9:18. Bengals 7–0. **Drive: 9 plays, 76 yards, 5:42.**
- BUF – Josh Allen 2-yard run (Tyler Bass kick), 6:03. Tied 7–7. **Drive: 7 plays, 85 yards, 3:15.**
- CIN – Joe Mixon 2-yard run (Evan McPherson kick), 0:35. Bengals 14–7. **Drive: 11 plays, 69 yards, 5:28.**

**Second quarter**

- CIN – Drew Sample 22-yard pass from Joe Burrow (Evan McPherson kick), 1:37. Bengals 21–7. **Drive: 7 plays, 45 yards, 1:52.**

**Third quarter**

- BUF – Tyler Bass 34-yard field goal, 10:21. Bengals 21–10. **Drive: 11 plays, 58 yards, 4:39.**

**Fourth quarter**

- CIN – Evan McPherson 20-yard field goal, 8:08. Bengals 24–10. **Drive: 12 plays, 85 yards, 5:10.**
- BUF – Stefon Diggs 17-yard pass from Josh Allen (Josh Allen-Stefon Diggs pass), 3:32. Bengals 24–18. **Drive: 12 plays, 75 yards, 4:36.**

**Top passers**

- BUF – Josh Allen – 26/38, 258 yards, TD, INT
- CIN – Joe Burrow – 31/44, 348 yards, 2 TD

**Top rushers**

- BUF – Josh Allen – 8 rushes, 44 yards, TD
- CIN – Joe Mixon – 14 rushes, 37 yards, TD

**Top receivers**

- BUF – Stefon Diggs – 6 receptions, 86 yards, TD
- CIN – Tee Higgins – 8 receptions, 110 yards

In a rematch of the 2022 AFC Divisional Round, the Bengals continued their winning streak by defeating a Buffalo team that struggled their way to a 5–3 record before this important Week 9 contest. Cincinnati struck first on their opening drive on a touchdown pass from Burrow to tight end Irv Smith Jr. Buffalo would respond with a two-yard touchdown run by quarterback Josh Allen on their opening drive, but the Bengals would then score 14 unanswered points (which came on a Mixon touchdown run and a Burrow touchdown pass to tight end Drew Sample) before halftime. In the second half, Cincinnati's offense could not get much going against Buffalo's injury-riddled defense, but Cincinnati's defense prevented Buffalo's offense from fully erasing the deficit. Buffalo would eventually cut Cincy's lead to six points on an 17-yard Allen touchdown pass to star wide receiver Stefon Diggs (and a successful two-point conversion from Allen to Diggs), but the Bengals ran out the clock on their next possession. Before the game, Damar Hamlin walked on the field and reflected on where he was when collapsed and suffered cardiac arrest earlier in the year.

==== Week 10: vs. Houston Texans ====
Week 10: Houston Texans at Cincinnati Bengals – Game summary

Quarter	1	2	3	4	Total
**Texans**	0	10	10	10	**30**
Bengals	7	0	10	10	**27**

at Paycor Stadium, Cincinnati, Ohio

- Date: November 12
- Game time: 1:00 p.m. EST
- Game weather: Sunny, 56 °F (13 °C)
- Game attendance: 66,526
- Referee: Carl Cheffers
- TV announcers (CBS): Kevin Harlan, Trent Green and Melanie Collins
- Recap, Game Book

Game information

**First quarter**

- CIN – Trenton Irwin 32-yard pass from Joe Burrow (Evan McPherson kick), 9:43. Bengals 7–0. **Drive: 10 plays, 75 yards, 5:17.**

**Second quarter**

- HOU – Tank Dell 6-yard pass from C. J. Stroud (Matt Ammendola kick), 10:33. Tied 7–7. **Drive: 7 plays, 66 yards, 3:03.**
- HOU – Matt Ammendola 45-yard field goal, 0:10. Texans 10–7. **Drive: 9 plays, 61 yards, 2:30.**

**Third quarter**

- HOU – Matt Ammendola 22-yard field goal, 9:27. Texans 13–7. **Drive: 11 plays, 72 yards, 5:33.**
- HOU – Devin Singletary 6-yard run (Matt Ammendola kick), 7:08. Texans 20–7. **Drive: 2 plays, 59 yards, 0:51.**
- CIN – Evan McPherson 50-yard field goal, 3:00. Texans 20–10. **Drive: 7 plays, 43 yards, 4:08.**
- CIN – Ja'Marr Chase 64-yard pass from Joe Burrow (Evan McPherson kick), 0:10. Texans 20–17. **Drive: 3 plays, 73 yards, 1:23.**

**Fourth quarter**

- HOU – C. J. Stroud 8-yard run (Matt Ammendola kick), 12:47. Texans 27–17. **Drive: 6 plays, 75 yards, 2:23.**
- CIN – Joe Mixon 1-yard run (Evan McPherson kick), 3:18. Texans 27–24. **Drive: 2 plays, 4 yards, 0:15.**
- CIN – Evan McPherson 31-yard field goal, 1:33. Tied 27–27. **Drive: 6 plays, 58 yards, 0:37.**
- HOU – Matt Ammendola 38-yard field goal, 0:00. Texans 30–27. **Drive: 6 plays, 55 yards, 1:33.**

**Top passers**

- HOU – C. J. Stroud – 23/39, 356 yards, TD, INT
- CIN – Joe Burrow – 27/40, 347 yards, 2 TD, 2 INT

**Top rushers**

- HOU – Devin Singletary – 30 rushes, 150 yards, TD
- CIN – Joe Mixon – 11 rushes, 46 yards, TD

**Top receivers**

- HOU – Noah Brown – 7 receptions, 172 yards
- CIN – Ja'Marr Chase – 5 receptions, 124 yards, TD

==== Week 11: at Baltimore Ravens ====
Week 11: Cincinnati Bengals at Baltimore Ravens – Game summary

Quarter	1	2	3	4	Total
Bengals	3	7	3	7	**20**
**Ravens**	7	14	6	7	**34**

at M&T Bank Stadium, Baltimore, Maryland

- Date: November 16
- Game time: 8:15 p.m. EST
- Game weather: Clear, 56 °F (13 °C)
- Game attendance: 70,997
- Referee: Adrian Hill
- TV announcers (WCPO/Prime Video): Al Michaels, Kirk Herbstreit, and Kaylee Hartung
- Recap, Game Book

Game information

**First quarter**

- BAL – Gus Edwards 3-yard run (Justin Tucker kick), 10:02. Ravens 7–0. **Drive: 9 plays, 75 yards, 4:58.**
- BAL – Evan McPherson 50-yard field goal, 7:32. Ravens 7–3. **Drive: 7 plays, 44 yards, 2:30.**

**Second quarter**

- CIN – Joe Mixon 4-yard pass from Joe Burrow (Evan McPherson kick), 5:49. Bengals 10–7. **Drive: 12 plays, 82 yards, 7:22.**
- BAL – Nelson Agholor 37-yard pass from Lamar Jackson (Justin Tucker kick), 2:20. Ravens 14–10. **Drive: 7 plays, 75 yards, 3:29.**
- BAL – Rashod Bateman 10-yard pass from Lamar Jackson (Justin Tucker kick), 0:23. Ravens 21–10. **Drive: 7 plays, 80 yards, 1:07.**

**Third quarter**

- CIN – Evan McPherson 26-yard field goal, 9:56. Ravens 21–13. **Drive: 10 plays, 67 yards, 5:04.**
- BAL – Justin Tucker 25-yard field goal, 4:02. Ravens 24–13. **Drive: 10 plays, 68 yards, 5:54.**
- BAL – Justin Tucker 47-yard field goal, 0:26. Ravens 27–13. **Drive: 5 plays, 27 yards, 1:45.**

**Fourth quarter**

- BAL – Gus Edwards 3-yard run (Justin Tucker kick), 4:49. Ravens 34–13. **Drive: 6 plays, 68 yards, 3:36.**
- CIN – Ja'Marr Chase 2-yard pass from Jake Browning (Evan McPherson kick), 1:08. Ravens 34–20. **Drive: 8 plays, 75 yards, 3:41.**

**Top passers**

- CIN – Joe Burrow – 11/17, 101 yards, TD
- BAL – Lamar Jackson – 16/26, 264 yards, 2 TD

**Top rushers**

- CIN – Joe Mixon – 16 rushes, 69 yards
- BAL – Gus Edwards – 11 rushes, 61 yards, 2 TD

**Top receivers**

- CIN – Tanner Hudson – 4 receptions, 49 yards
- BAL – Odell Beckham Jr. – 4 receptions, 116 yards

In addition to losing the game, the Bengals suffered a devastating blow when QB Joe Burrow suffered a wrist injury in the 2nd quarter; it was later revealed to be season-ending.

==== Week 12: vs. Pittsburgh Steelers ====
Week 12: Pittsburgh Steelers at Cincinnati Bengals – Game summary

Quarter	1	2	3	4	Total
**Steelers**	0	3	7	6	**16**
Bengals	0	7	0	3	**10**

at Paycor Stadium, Cincinnati, Ohio

- Date: November 26
- Game time: 1:00 p.m. EST
- Game weather: Rain, 48 °F (9 °C)
- Game attendance: 65,090
- Referee: Brad Rogers
- TV announcers (CBS): Ian Eagle, Charles Davis and Evan Washburn
- Recap, Game Book

Game information

**First quarter**

- No scoring plays.

**Second quarter**

- PIT – Chris Boswell 41-yard field goal, 12:39. Steelers 3–0. **Drive: 8 plays, 66 yards, 3:44.**
- CIN – Drew Sample 11-yard pass from Jake Browning (Evan McPherson kick), 10:30. Bengals 7–3. **Drive: 4 plays, 53 yards, 2:09.**

**Third quarter**

- PIT – Najee Harris 5-yard run (Chris Boswell kick), 1:34. Steelers 10–7. **Drive: 14 plays, 79 yards, 7:50.**

**Fourth quarter**

- PIT – Chris Boswell 34-yard field goal, 8:03. Steelers 13–7. **Drive: 10 plays, 62 yards, 5:07.**
- PIT – Chris Boswell 33-yard field goal, 2:51. Steelers 16–7. **Drive: 7 plays, 52 yards, 3:07.**
- CIN – Evan McPherson 47-yard field goal, 2:04. Steelers 16–10. **Drive: 5 plays, 47 yards, 0:47.**

**Top passers**

- PIT – Kenny Pickett – 24/33, 278 yards
- CIN – Jake Browning – 19/26, 227 yards, TD, INT

**Top rushers**

- PIT – Najee Harris – 15 rushes, 99 yards, TD
- CIN – Joe Mixon – 8 rushes, 16 yards

**Top receivers**

- PIT – Pat Freiermuth – 9 receptions, 120 yards
- CIN – Ja'Marr Chase – 4 receptions, 81 yards

==== Week 13: at Jacksonville Jaguars ====
Week 13: Cincinnati Bengals at Jacksonville Jaguars – Game summary

Quarter	1	2	3	4	OT	Total
**Bengals**	0	14	7	10	3	**34**
Jaguars	7	7	14	3	0	**31**

at EverBank Stadium, Jacksonville, Florida

- Date: December 4
- Game time: 8:15 p.m. EST
- Game weather: 61 °F (16 °C)
- Game attendance: 67,951
- Referee: Scott Novak
- TV announcers (ESPN/ABC): Joe Buck, Troy Aikman, and Lisa Salters
- Recap, Game Book

Game information

**First quarter**

- JAX – Travis Etienne 4-yard run (Brandon McManus kick), 6:51. Jaguars 7–0. **Drive: 7 plays, 51 yards, 3:49.**

**Second quarter**

- CIN – Joe Mixon 6-yard run (Evan McPherson kick), 12:24. Tied 7–7. **Drive: 8 plays, 92 yards, 3:52.**
- JAX – Evan Engram 22-yard pass from Trevor Lawrence (Brandon McManus kick), 6:24. Jaguars 14–7. **Drive: 10 plays, 75 yards, 6:00.**
- CIN – Joe Mixon 2-yard run (Evan McPherson kick), 1:04. Tied 14–14. **Drive: 12 plays, 75 yards, 5:20.**

**Third quarter**

- CIN – Ja'Marr Chase 76-yard pass from Jake Browning (Evan McPherson kick), 11:50. Bengals 21–14. **Drive: 3 plays, 84 yards, 1:31.**
- JAX – Parker Washington 14-yard pass from Trevor Lawrence (Brandon McManus kick), 5:26. Tied 21–21. **Drive: 12 plays, 84 yards, 6:24.**
- JAX – Trevor Lawrence 1-yard run (Brandon McManus kick), 3:10. Jaguars 28–21. **Drive: 4 plays, 9 yards, 2:06.**

**Fourth quarter**

- CIN – Jake Browning 1-yard run (Evan McPherson kick), 9:27. Tied 28–28. **Drive: 9 plays, 48 yards, 4:16.**
- CIN – Evan McPherson 54-yard field goal, 2:28. Bengals 31–28. **Drive: 7 plays, 26 yards, 2:31.**
- JAX – Brandon McManus 40-yard field goal, 0:26. Tied 31–31. **Drive: 9 plays, 53 yards, 2:02.**

**Overtime**

- CIN – Evan McPherson 48-yard field goal, 1:45. Bengals 34–31. **Drive: 12 plays, 42 yards, 3:17.**

**Top passers**

- CIN – Jake Browning – 32/37, 354 yards, TD
- JAX – Trevor Lawrence – 22/29, 258 yards, 2 TD

**Top rushers**

- CIN – Joe Mixon – 19 rushes, 68 yards, 2 TD
- JAX – Travis Etienne – 11 rushes, 45 yards, TD

**Top receivers**

- CIN – Ja'Marr Chase – 11 receptions, 149 yards, TD
- JAX – Evan Engram – 9 receptions, 82 yards, TD

==== Week 14: vs. Indianapolis Colts ====
Week 14: Indianapolis Colts at Cincinnati Bengals – Game summary

Quarter	1	2	3	4	Total
Colts	0	14	0	0	**14**
**Bengals**	7	7	14	6	**34**

at Paycor Stadium, Cincinnati, Ohio

- Date: December 10
- Game time: 1:00 p.m. EST
- Game weather: Cloudy, 40 °F (4 °C)
- Game attendance: 65,981
- Referee: Shawn Hochuli
- TV announcers (CBS): Tom McCarthy, James Lofton, Jay Feely and Tiffany Blackmon
- Recap, Game Book

Game information

**First quarter**

- CIN – Chase Brown 54-yard pass from Jake Browning (Evan McPherson kick), 6:31. Bengals 7–0. **Drive: 4 plays, 92 yards, 2:11.**

**Second quarter**

- CIN – Joe Mixon 1-yard run (Evan McPherson kick), 10:18. Bengals 14–0. **Drive: 11 plays, 72 yards, 5:57.**
- IND – Mo Alie-Cox 2-yard pass from Gardner Minshew (kick failed), 1:56. Bengals 14–6. **Drive: 17 plays, 79 yards, 8:22.**
- IND – Ronnie Harrison 36-yard interception return (Gardner Minshew-Michael Pittman Jr. pass), 1:31. Tied 14–14.

**Third quarter**

- CIN – Tanner Hudson 11-yard pass from Jake Browning (Evan McPherson kick), 11:38. Bengals 21–14. **Drive: 6 plays, 75 yards, 3:22.**
- CIN – Jake Browning 1-yard run (Evan McPherson kick), 2:59. Bengals 28–14. **Drive: 11 plays, 71 yards, 6:33.**

**Fourth quarter**

- CIN – Evan McPherson 32-yard field goal, 11:14. Bengals 31–14. **Drive: 4 plays, 2 yards, 2:18.**
- CIN – Evan McPherson 35-yard field goal, 1:55. Bengals 34–14. **Drive: 6 plays, 18 yards, 3:16.**

**Top passers**

- IND – Gardner Minshew – 26/39, 240 yards, TD, INT
- CIN – Jake Browning – 18/24, 275 yards, 2 TD, INT

**Top rushers**

- IND – Zack Moss – 13 rushes, 28 yards
- CIN – Joe Mixon – 21 rushes, 79 yards, TD

**Top receivers**

- IND – Michael Pittman Jr. – 8 receptions, 95 yards
- CIN – Chase Brown – 3 receptions, 80 yards, TD

==== Week 15: vs. Minnesota Vikings ====
Week 15: Minnesota Vikings at Cincinnati Bengals – Game summary

Quarter	1	2	3	4	OT	Total
Vikings	7	0	10	7	0	**24**
**Bengals**	3	0	0	21	3	**27**

at Paycor Stadium, Cincinnati, Ohio

- Date: December 16
- Game time: 1:00 p.m. EST
- Game weather: Mostly cloudy, 53 °F (12 °C)
- Game attendance: 66,376
- Referee: Bill Vinovich
- TV announcers (WCPO/NFLN): Chris Rose, Jason McCourty and Steve Wyche
- Recap, Game Book

Game information

**First quarter**

- CIN – Evan McPherson 34-yard field goal, 8:41. Bengals 3–0. **Drive: 11 plays, 59 yards, 6:16.**
- MIN – Ty Chandler 1-yard run (Greg Joseph kick), 2:23. Vikings 7–3. **Drive: 12 plays, 75 yards, 6:18.**

**Second quarter**

- No scoring plays.

**Third quarter**

- MIN – Jordan Addison 37-yard pass from Nick Mullens (Greg Joseph kick), 10:46. Vikings 14–3. **Drive: 8 plays, 92 yards, 4:14.**
- MIN – Greg Joseph 39-yard field goal, 4:32. Vikings 17–3. **Drive: 8 plays, 36 yards, 4:36.**

**Fourth quarter**

- CIN – Tee Higgins 13-yard pass from Jake Browning (Evan McPherson kick), 14:56. Vikings 17–10. **Drive: 8 plays, 75 yards, 4:36.**
- CIN – Joe Mixon 1-yard run (Evan McPherson kick), 7:46. Tied 17–17. **Drive: 11 plays, 63 yards, 5:36.**
- MIN – Jordan Addison 1-yard pass from Nick Mullens (Greg Joseph kick), 3:48. Vikings 24–17. **Drive: 7 plays, 75 yards, 3:58.**
- CIN – Tee Higgins 21-yard pass from Jake Browning (Evan McPherson kick), 0:39. Tied 24–24. **Drive: 10 plays, 75 yards, 3:09.**

**Overtime**

- CIN – Evan McPherson 29-yard field goal, 3:11. Bengals 27–24. **Drive: 6 plays, 47 yards, 3:01.**

**Top passers**

- MIN – Nick Mullens – 26/33, 303 yards, 2 TD, 2 INT
- CIN – Jake Browning – 29/42, 324 yards, 2 TD, INT

**Top rushers**

- MIN – Ty Chandler – 23 rushes, 132 yards, TD
- CIN – Joe Mixon – 10 rushes, 47 yards, TD

**Top receivers**

- MIN – Jordan Addison – 6 receptions, 111 yards, 2 TD
- CIN – Ja'Marr Chase – 4 receptions, 64 yards

==== Week 16: at Pittsburgh Steelers ====
Week 16: Cincinnati Bengals at Pittsburgh Steelers – Game summary

Quarter	1	2	3	4	Total
Bengals	0	0	11	0	**11**
**Steelers**	7	17	7	3	**34**

at Acrisure Stadium, Pittsburgh, Pennsylvania

- Date: December 23
- Game time: 4:30 p.m. EST
- Game weather: Cloudy, 49 °F (9 °C)
- Game attendance: 66,646
- Referee: Craig Wrolstad
- TV announcers (NBC): Noah Eagle, Todd Blackledge, and Kathryn Tappen
- Recap, Game Book

Game information

**First quarter**

- PIT – George Pickens 86-yard pass from Mason Rudolph (Chris Boswell kick), 10:45. Steelers 7–0. **Drive: 2 plays, 92 yards, 0:52.**

**Second quarter**

- PIT – Calvin Austin 7-yard run (Chris Boswell kick), 14:21. Steelers 14–0. **Drive: 10 plays, 80 yards, 5:40.**
- PIT – Najee Harris 3-yard run (Chris Boswell kick), 7:06. Steelers 21–0. **Drive: 4 plays, 14 yards, 1:35.**
- PIT – Chris Boswell 50-yard field goal, 0:00. Steelers 24–0. **Drive: 12 plays, 64 yards, 2:14.**

**Third quarter**

- CIN – Tee Higgins 80-yard pass from Jake Browning (Jake Browning-Joe Mixon pass), 11:11. Steelers 24–8. **Drive: 1 play, 80 yards, 0:11.**
- PIT – George Pickens 66-yard pass from Mason Rudolph (Chris Boswell kick), 9:38. Steelers 31–8. **Drive: 3 plays, 75 yards, 1:33.**
- CIN – Evan McPherson 35-yard field goal, 0:00. Steelers 31–11. **Drive: 12 plays, 51 yards, 5:08.**

**Fourth quarter**

- PIT – Chris Boswell 30-yard field goal, 6:57. Steelers 34–11. **Drive: 9 plays, 31 yards, 5:21.**

**Top passers**

- CIN – Jake Browning – 28/42, 335 yards, TD, 3 INT
- PIT – Mason Rudolph – 17/27, 290 yards, 2 TD

**Top rushers**

- CIN – Joe Mixon – 11 rushes, 43 yards
- PIT – Najee Harris – 19 rushes, 78 yards, TD

**Top receivers**

- CIN – Tee Higgins – 5 receptions, 140 yards, TD
- PIT – George Pickens – 4 receptions, 195 yards, 2 TD

After a tough win at home, the Bengals traveled to Pittsburgh for Round 2 against the Steelers. Heading into halftime, they fell behind 24–0 before finally scoring in the third quarter when Jake Browning found Tee Higgins on an 80-yard touchdown pass (with a successful two-point conversion), making the score 24–8. They fell behind 31–8 after Mason Rudolph found George Pickens on a 66-yard touchdown pass for the Steelers to increase their lead. The Bengals managed to somewhat shorten their deficit 31-11 when Evan McPherson kicked a 35-yard field goal. They would be kept from scoring the whole fourth quarter as the Steelers scored one last time off of Chris Boswell's 30-yard field goal to make the final score 34–11.

With their 3-game winning streak snapped, the Bengals fell to 8–7. They would also be swept by the Steelers for the first time since 2019.

==== Week 17: at Kansas City Chiefs ====
Week 17: Cincinnati Bengals at Kansas City Chiefs – Game summary

Quarter	1	2	3	4	Total
Bengals	3	14	0	0	**17**
**Chiefs**	7	6	3	9	**25**

at Arrowhead Stadium, Kansas City, Missouri

- Date: December 31
- Game time: 4:25 p.m. EST/3:25 p.m. CST
- Game weather: 36 °F (2 °C)
- Game attendance: 73,565
- Referee: John Hussey
- TV announcers (CBS): Jim Nantz, Tony Romo and Tracy Wolfson
- Recap, Game Book

Game information

**First quarter**

- CIN – Evan McPherson 34-yard field goal, 6:21. Bengals 3–0. **Drive: 15 plays, 59 yards, 8:39.**
- KC – Isiah Pacheco 8-yard pass from Patrick Mahomes (Harrison Butker kick), 2:58. Chiefs 7–3. **Drive: 7 plays, 75 yards, 3:23.**

**Second quarter**

- CIN – Joe Mixon 7-yard pass from Jake Browning (Evan McPherson kick), 11:29. Bengals 10–7. **Drive: 11 plays, 75 yards, 6:29.**
- CIN – Jake Browning 1-yard run (Evan McPherson kick), 6:23. Bengals 17–7. **Drive: 8 plays, 24 yards, 4:23.**
- KC – Harrison Butker 54-yard field goal, 3:44. Bengals 17–10. **Drive: 6 plays, 40 yards, 2:39.**
- KC – Harrison Butker 43-yard field goal, 0:35. Bengals 17–13. **Drive: 5 plays, 44 yards, 1:25.**

**Third quarter**

- KC – Harrison Butker 27-yard field goal, 4:31. Bengals 17–16. **Drive: 9 plays, 82 yards, 3:12.**

**Fourth quarter**

- KC – Harrison Butker 24-yard field goal, 14:09. Chiefs 19–17. **Drive: 7 plays, 85 yards, 3:30.**
- KC – Harrison Butker 48-yard field goal, 6:18. Chiefs 22–17. **Drive: 13 plays, 39 yards, 6:49.**
- KC – Harrison Butker 46-yard field goal, 2:59. Chiefs 25–17. **Drive: 4 plays, 9 yards, 1:34.**

**Top passers**

- CIN – Jake Browning – 19/33, 197 yards, TD
- KC – Patrick Mahomes – 21/29, 245 yards, TD

**Top rushers**

- CIN – Joe Mixon – 21 rushes, 65 yards
- KC – Isiah Pacheco – 18 rushes, 130 yards

**Top receivers**

- CIN – Ja'Marr Chase – 3 receptions, 41 yards
- KC – Rashee Rice – 5 receptions, 127 yards

After a tough road loss, the Bengals traveled to Kansas City to take on the Chiefs. The Bengals scored first in the first quarter when Evan McPherson kicked a 34-yard field goal for a 3–0 lead. The Chiefs then took the lead when Patrick Mahomes found Isiah Pacheco on an 8-yard touchdown pass to make it 7–3. In the second quarter, the Bengals were able to move up by 10, making the score 17–7 by way of Jake Browning's 8-yard touchdown pass to Joe Mixon, followed by his own QB sneak touchdown. Though, the Chiefs were able to make it 17–13 by way of 2 field goals kicked by Harrison Butker from 54 and 43 yards out. In the second half, it was all Chiefs scoring as Butker kicked 4 more field goals to make the final score 25–17. On the Bengals final drive, they converted a 4th and 18 at their own 32-yard line, but following two sacks to Jake Browning pushing them back to their own 38-yard line, and facing 4th and 27, Browning's throw to Tee Higgins fell incomplete, sealing the loss.

With their second straight loss, the Bengals fell to 8-8. Coupled with wins by the Steelers and Bills, they were also eliminated from postseason contention. The Steelers' win over the Seahawks also assures they will finish last place in the AFC North.

==== Week 18: vs. Cleveland Browns ====
Week 18: Cleveland Browns at Cincinnati Bengals – Game summary

Quarter	1	2	3	4	Total
Browns	0	0	0	14	**14**
**Bengals**	14	10	7	0	**31**

at Paycor Stadium, Cincinnati, Ohio

- Date: January 7
- Game time: 1:00 p.m. EST
- Game weather: Cloudy, 38 °F (3 °C)
- Game attendance: 65,865
- Referee: Alan Eck
- TV announcers (CBS): Tom McCarthy, James Lofton, Jay Feely and Tiffany Blackmon
- Recap, Game Book

Game information

**First quarter**

- CIN – Joe Mixon 1-yard run (Evan McPherson kick), 6:07. Bengals 7–0. **Drive: 7 plays, 60 yards, 4:03.**
- CIN – Joe Mixon 6-yard run (Evan McPherson kick), 0:48. Bengals 14–0. **Drive: 5 plays, 67 yards, 3:03.**

**Second quarter**

- CIN – Andrei Iosivas 3-yard pass from Jake Browning (Evan McPherson kick), 9:19. Bengals 21–0. **Drive: 8 plays, 75 yards, 5:25.**
- CIN – Evan McPherson 45-yard field goal, 1:55. Bengals 24–0. **Drive: 4 plays, 7 yards, 1:19.**

**Third quarter**

- CIN – Andrei Iosivas 7-yard pass from Jake Browning (Evan McPherson kick), 3:32. Bengals 31–0. **Drive: 14 plays, 99 yards, 8:12.**

**Fourth quarter**

- CLE – David Bell 31-yard pass from Jeff Driskel (Riley Patterson kick), 8:45. Bengals 31–7. **Drive: 5 plays, 55 yards, 2:08.**
- CLE – David Bell 24-yard pass from Jeff Driskel (Riley Patterson kick), 2:34. Bengals 31–14. **Drive: 9 plays, 75 yards, 3:58.**

**Top passers**

- CLE – Jeff Driskel – 13/26, 166 yards, 2 TD, 2 INT
- CIN – Jake Browning – 18/24, 156 yards, 3 TD, INT

**Top rushers**

- CLE – Pierre Strong Jr. – 14 rushes, 65 yards
- CIN – Joe Mixon – 14 rushes, 111 yards, TD

**Top receivers**

- CLE – David Bell – 4 receptions, 68 yards, 2 TD
- CIN – Andrei Iosivas – 5 receptions, 36 yards, 2 TD

With the Browns resting most of their starters for this game due to being locked into the 5-seed of the AFC Playoffs, the Bengals took full advantage with a 31–14 blowout win. The Bengals improved and finished the regular season at 9–8, meaning that every team in the AFC North finished above .500, marking the first time each team within an entire division finished the regular season with winning records since 1935. The win also prevented the Bengals from getting swept by all their division rivals.

=== Standings ===
==== Division ====
AFC North
	W	L	T	PCT	DIV	CONF	PF	PA	STK
^{(1)} Baltimore Ravens	13	4	0	.765	3–3	8–4	483	280	L1
^{(5)} Cleveland Browns	11	6	0	.647	3–3	8–4	396	362	L1
^{(7)} Pittsburgh Steelers	10	7	0	.588	5–1	7–5	304	324	W3
Cincinnati Bengals	9	8	0	.529	1–5	4–8	366	384	W1

==== Conference ====
AFC
#	Team	Division	W	L	T	PCT	DIV	CONF	SOS	SOV	STK
**Division leaders**
1	Baltimore Ravens	North	13	4	0	.765	3–3	8–4	.543	.529	L1
2 (Note: Buffalo claimed the No. 2 seed over Kansas City based on head-to-head victory.) (Note: Buffalo finished ahead of Miami in the AFC East based on head-to-head sweep.)	Buffalo Bills	East	11	6	0	.647	4–2	7–5	.471	.471	W5
3	Kansas City Chiefs	West	11	6	0	.647	4–2	9–3	.481	.428	W2
4	Houston Texans	South	10	7	0	.588	4–2	7–5	.474	.465	W2
**Wild cards**
5 (Note: Cleveland claimed the No. 5 seed over Miami based on conference record.)	Cleveland Browns	North	11	6	0	.647	3–3	8–4	.536	.513	L1
6	Miami Dolphins	East	11	6	0	.647	4–2	7–5	.450	.358	L2
7	Pittsburgh Steelers	North	10	7	0	.588	5–1	7–5	.540	.571	W3
**Did not qualify for the postseason**
8 (Note: Cincinnati finished ahead of Jacksonville based on head-to-head victory. Division tie break was initially used to eliminate Indianapolis (see below).)	Cincinnati Bengals	North	9	8	0	.529	1–5	4–8	.574	.536	W1
9 (Note: Jacksonville finished ahead of Indianapolis based on head-to-head sweep.)	Jacksonville Jaguars	South	9	8	0	.529	4–2	6–6	.533	.477	L1
10	Indianapolis Colts	South	9	8	0	.529	3–3	7–5	.491	.444	L1
11 (Note: Las Vegas finished ahead of Denver based on head-to-head sweep.)	Las Vegas Raiders	West	8	9	0	.471	4–2	6–6	.488	.426	W1
12	Denver Broncos	West	8	9	0	.471	3–3	5–7	.488	.485	L1
13	New York Jets	East	7	10	0	.412	2–4	4–8	.502	.454	W1
14	Tennessee Titans	South	6	11	0	.353	1–5	4–8	.522	.422	W1
15	Los Angeles Chargers	West	5	12	0	.294	1–5	3–9	.529	.388	L5
16	New England Patriots	East	4	13	0	.235	2–4	4–8	.522	.529	L2
**Tiebreakers** (Note: When breaking ties for three or more teams under the NFL's rules, they are first broken within divisions, then comparing only the highest ranked remaining team from each division.)
