= List of Baltimore Ravens team records =

Baltimore Ravens records

The Baltimore Ravens are an American professional football club based in Baltimore, Maryland. The team, which plays in the North division of the American Football Conference (AFC) of the National Football League (NFL), began play in 1996 after the move the from Cleveland to Baltimore.

This list encompasses the major honors won by the Baltimore Ravens as well as records set by the team, its coaches, and its players. All records are accurate as of the end of the 2025 season.

== Championships ==
=== Super Bowl championships ===
Season	Coach	Super Bowl	Location	Opponent	Score	Record
2000	Brian Billick	XXXV	Raymond James Stadium (Tampa)	New York Giants	34–7	12–4
2012	John Harbaugh	XLVII	Caesars Superdome (New Orleans)	San Francisco 49ers	34–31	10–6
Total Super Bowls won: 2

=== AFC championships ===
Season	Coach	Location	Opponent	Score
2000	Brian Billick	Network Associates Coliseum (Oakland)	Oakland Raiders	16–3
2012	John Harbaugh	Gillette Stadium (Foxborough)	New England Patriots	28–13
Total AFC Championships won: 2

=== Division championships ===
Year	Coach	Record
2003	Brian Billick	10–6
2006	Brian Billick	13–3
2011	John Harbaugh	12–4
2012	John Harbaugh	10–6
2018	John Harbaugh	10–6
2019	John Harbaugh	14–2
2023	John Harbaugh	13–4
2024	John Harbaugh	12–5
Total division titles won: 8

== Career ==
Key
	NFL record
**Bold**	Currently active

=== Games played ===
No.	Player	Position	Years	Total	Regular season	Playoffs	Ref.
1	Sam Koch	P	2006–2021	276	256	20	
2	Ray Lewis	LB	1996–2012	249	228	21	
3	Terrell Suggs	OLB	2003–2018	247	229	18	
4	Justin Tucker	K	2012–2024	227	212	15	
5	Matt Stover	K	1996–2008	218	207	11	

=== Top passers (career) ===
No.	Player	Position	Years	Completions	Attempts	Yards	Touchdowns	Interceptions	Rtg.	Ref.
1	Joe Flacco	QB	2008–2018	3,499	5,670	38,245	212	136	84.1	
2	**Lamar Jackson**	QB	2018–present	1,870	2,888	22,608	187	56	102.2 (Note: Tied with Aaron Rodgers)	
3	Kyle Boller	QB	2003–2007	746	1,311	7,846	45	44	71.9	
4	Vinny Testaverde	QB	1996–1997	596	1,011	7,148	51	34	82.4	
5	Steve McNair	QB	2006–2007	428	673	4,163	18	16	79.9	

=== Top rushers (career) ===
No.	Player	Position	Years	Attempts	Yards	Touchdowns	Yards per carry	Ref.
1	Jamal Lewis	RB	2000–2006	1,822	7,801	45	4.3	
2	**Lamar Jackson**	QB	2018–present	1,081	6,522 (Note: For a quarterback)	35	6.0	
3	Ray Rice	RB	2008–2013	1,430	6,180	37	4.3	
4	**Derrick Henry**	RB	2024–present	632	3,516	32	5.6	
5	Gus Edwards	RB	2018–2023	699	3,395	26	4.9	

=== Top receivers (career) ===
No.	Player	Position	Years	Receptions	Yards	Average	Touchdowns	Ref.
1	**Mark Andrews**	TE	2018–present	484	5,952	12.3	56	
2	Derrick Mason	WR	2005–2010	471	5,777	12.3	29	
3	Todd Heap	TE	2001–2010	467	5,492	11.8	41	
4	Torrey Smith	WR	2011–2014	213	3,591	16.9	30	
5	**Zay Flowers**	WR	2023–present	237	3,123	13.2	14	

=== Tackles (career) ===
No.	Player	Position	Years	Combined	Solo	Assist	Ref.
1	Ray Lewis	LB	1996–2012	2,059	1,568	491	
2	Terrell Suggs	OLB	2003–2018	855	606	249	
3	Ed Reed	S	2002–2012	608	507	101	
4	C.J. Mosley	LB	2014–2018	579	387	192	
5	Kelly Gregg	DT	2001–2010	533	370	163	

=== Sacks (career) ===
No.	Player	Position	Years	Sacks	Ref.
1	Terrell Suggs	OLB	2003–2018	132.5	
2	Peter Boulware	OLB	1997–2005	70.0	
3	Michael McCrary	DE	1997–2002	51.0	
4	Ray Lewis	LB	1996–2012	41.5	
5	Adalius Thomas	DE	2000–2006	38.5	

=== Interceptions (career) ===
No.	Player	Position	Years	Interceptions	Yards	Touchdowns	Ref.
1	Ed Reed	S	2002–2012	61	1,541	7	
2	Ray Lewis	LB	1996–2012	31	503	3	
3	Chris McAlister	CB	1999–2008	26	486	5	
4	**Marlon Humphrey**	CB	2017–present	23	175	1	
5	Rod Woodson	S	1998–2001	20	380	5	
5	Duane Starks	CB	1998–2001	20	196	1	

== Season ==
=== Passing (season) ===
No.	Player	Position	Season	Completions	Attempts	Yards	Touchdowns	Interceptions	Rtg.	Ref.
1	Joe Flacco	QB	2016	436	672	4,317	20	15	83.5	
2	Vinny Testaverde	QB	1996	325	549	4,177	33	19	88.7	
3	Lamar Jackson	QB	2024	316	474	4,172	41	4	119.6	
4	Joe Flacco	QB	2014	344	554	3,986	27	12	91.0	
5	Joe Flacco	QB	2013	362	614	3,912	19	22	73.1	

=== Rushing (season) ===
No.	Player	Position	Season	Attempts	Yards	Touchdowns	Yards per carry	Ref.
1	Jamal Lewis	RB	2003	387	2,066	14	5.3	
2	Derrick Henry	RB	2024	325	1,921	16	5.9	
3	Derrick Henry	RB	2025	307	1,595	16	5.2	
4	Jamal Lewis	RB	2000	309	1,364	6	4.4	
4	Ray Rice	RB	2011	291	1,364	12	4.7	
5	Ray Rice	RB	2009	254	1,339	7	5.3	

=== Receiving yards (season) ===
No.	Player	Position	Season	Reception	Yards	Average	Touchdowns	Ref.
1	Mark Andrews	TE	2021	107	1,361	12.7	9	
2	Zay Flowers	WR	2025	86	1,211	14.1	5	
3	Michael Jackson	WR	1996	76	1,201	15.8	14	
4	Torrey Smith	WR	2013	65	1,128	17.4	4	
5	Qadry Ismail	WR	1999	58	1,105	16.3	6	

=== Tackles (season) ===
No.	Player	Position	Season	Combined	Solo	Assist	Ref.
1	Ray Lewis	LB	1997	184	156	28	
2	Ray Lewis	LB	1999	165	130	35	
3	Ray Lewis	LB	2003	163	121	42	
4	Ray Lewis	LB	2001	162	114	48	
5	Roquan Smith	LB	2023	158	84	74	

=== Sacks (season) ===
No.	Player	Position	Season	Sacks	Ref.
1	Elvis Dumervil	OLB	2014	17.0	
2	Peter Boulware	OLB	2001	15.0	
3	Michael McCrary	DE	1998	14.5	
4	Terrell Suggs	LB	2011	14.0	
5	Nnamdi Madubuike	DT	2023	13.0	
5	Trevor Pryce	DE	2006	13.0	

=== Interceptions (season) ===
No.	Player	Position	Season	Interceptions	Yards	Touchdowns	Ref.
1	Ed Reed	S	2006	9	358	1	
2	Ed Reed	S	2008	9	264	2	
3	Ed Reed	S	2010	8	183	0	
4	Ed Reed	S	2003	7	132	1	
5	Ed Reed	S	2007	7	130	0	
5	Rod Woodson	S	1999	7	195	2	
5	Geno Stone	S	2023	7	101	0	

== Game ==
=== Passing yards (game) ===
No.	Player	Position	Game	Yards	Ref.
1	Lamar Jackson	QB	October 11, 2021 vs. Indianapolis Colts	442	
2	Vinny Testaverde	QB	October 27, 1996 vs. St. Louis Rams	429	
3	Joe Flacco	QB	September 25, 2011 vs. St. Louis Rams	389	
4	Joe Flacco	QB	October 18, 2009 vs. Minnesota Vikings	385	
5	Joe Flacco	QB	September 20, 2015 vs. Oakland Raiders	384	

=== Rushing yards (game) ===
No.	Player	Position	Game	Yards	Ref.
1	Jamal Lewis	RB	September 14, 2003 vs. Cleveland Browns	295	
2	Priest Holmes	RB	November 11, 1998 vs. Cincinnati Bengals	227	
3	Derrick Henry	RB	December 27, 2025 vs. Green Bay Packers	216	
4	Jamal Lewis	RB	December 21, 2003 vs. Cleveland Browns	205	
5	Ray Rice	RB	December 4, 2011 vs. Cleveland Browns	204	

=== Receiving yards (game) ===
No.	Player	Position	Game	Yards	Ref.
1	Qadry Ismail	WR	December 12, 1999 vs. Pittsburgh Steelers	248	
2	Derrick Alexander	WR	December 1, 1996 vs. Pittsburgh Steelers	198	
3	Steve Smith Sr.	WR	September 27, 2015 vs. Cincinnati Bengals	186	
4	Torrey Smith	WR	September 29, 2013 vs. Buffalo Bills	166	
5	Torrey Smith	WR	November 20, 2011 vs. Cleveland Browns	165	

=== Tackles (game) ===
No.	Player	Position	Game	Combined	Solo	Assist	Ref.
1	Ray Lewis	LB	September 14, 1997 vs. New York Giants	21	14	7	
2	Roquan Smith	LB	November 12, 2023 vs. Cleveland Browns	21	14	7	
3	Kelly Gregg	DT	September 30, 2002 vs. Denver Broncos	18	11	7	
4	Ray Lewis	LB	September 30, 2002 vs. Denver Broncos	18	11	7	
5	Ray Lewis	LB	December 2, 2001 vs. Indianapolis Colts	18	11	7	
5	Ray Lewis	LB	November 30, 2003 vs. San Francisco 49ers	18	14	4	
5	Roquan Smith	LB	October 21, 2024 vs. Tampa Bay Buccaneers	18	11	7	

=== Sacks (game) ===
No.	Player	Position	Game	Sacks	Ref.
1	Peter Boulware	OLB	January 7, 2002 vs. Minnesota Vikings	4.0	
2	Michael McCrary	DE	November 8, 1998 vs. Oakland Raiders	4.0	
3	Elvis Dumervil	OLB	December 7, 2014 vs. Miami Dolphins	3.5	
4	Michael McCrary	DE	December 5, 1999 vs. Tennessee Titans	3.5	
5	Jamie Sharper	OLB	November 12, 2001 vs. Tennessee Titans	3.5	

=== Interceptions (game) ===
No.	Player	Position	Game	Interceptions	Yards	Touchdowns	Ref.
1	Ed Reed	S	November 23, 2008 vs. Philadelphia Eagles	2	150	1	
2	Ray Lewis	LB	December 23, 1998 vs. Cincinnati Bengals	2	94	0	
3	Ed Reed	S	September 26, 2006 vs. Cincinnati Bengals	2	90	0	
4	Chris McAlister	CB	November 12, 2003 vs. Arizona Cardinals	2	87	1	
5	Duane Starks	CB	December 24, 2000 vs. New York Jets	2	85	0	

== Rookie season ==
=== Passing (rookie season) ===
No.	Player	Position	Season	Completions	Attempts	Yards	Touchdowns	Interceptions	Rtg.	Ref.
1	Joe Flacco	QB	2008	257	428	2,971	14	12	80.3	
2	Kyle Boller	QB	2003	116	224	1,260	7	9	62.4	
3	Lamar Jackson	QB	2018	99	170	1,201	6	3	84.5	
4	Troy Smith	QB	2007	40	76	452	2	0	79.5	
5	Anthony Brown	QB	2022	22	49	302	0	2	48.2	

=== Rushing (rookie season) ===
No.	Player	Position	Season	Attempts	Yards	Touchdowns	Yards per carry	Ref.
1	Jamal Lewis	RB	2000	309	1,364	6	4.4	
2	J. K. Dobbins	RB	2020	134	805	9	6.0	
3	Gus Edwards	RB	2018	137	718	2	5.2	
4	Lamar Jackson	QB	2018	147	695	5	4.7	
5	Jason Brookins	RB	2001	151	551	5	3.6	

=== Receiving yards (rookie season) ===
No.	Player	Position	Season	Reception	Yards	Average	Touchdowns	Ref.
1	Zay Flowers	WR	2023	77	858	11.1	5	
2	Torrey Smith	WR	2011	50	841	16.8	7	
3	Marquise Brown	WR	2019	46	584	12.7	7	
4	Mark Andrews	TE	2018	34	552	16.2	3	
5	Marlon Brown	WR	2013	49	524	10.7	7	

=== Tackles (rookie season) ===
No.	Player	Position	Season	Combined	Solo	Assist	Ref.
1	C.J. Mosley	LB	2014	133	88	45	
2	Ray Lewis	LB	1996	110	95	15	
3	Patrick Queen	LB	2020	106	66	40	
4	Teddye Buchanan	LB	2025	93	49	44	
5	Ed Reed	S	2002	85	71	14	

=== Sacks (rookie season) ===
No.	Player	Position	Season	Sacks	Ref.
1	Terrell Suggs	OLB	2003	12.0	
2	Peter Boulware	DE	2011	11.5	
3	Pernell McPhee	DE	1998	6.0	
4	Za'Darius Smith	OLB	2015	5.5	
5	Odafe Oweh	OLB	2021	5.0	

=== Interceptions (rookie season) ===
No.	Player	Position	Season	Interceptions	Yards	Touchdowns	Ref.
1	Ed Reed	S	2002	5	167	0	
2	Dawan Landry	S	2006	5	101	1	
3	Chris McAlister	CB	1999	5	28	0	
4	Duane Starks	CB	1998	5	3	0	
5	Chad Williams	S	2002	3	98	1	

== Playoffs ==
=== Top passers (playoffs) ===
No.	Player	Position	Years	Completions	Attempts	Yards	Touchdowns	Interceptions	Rtg.	Ref.
1	Joe Flacco	QB	2008–2018	253	447	3,223	25	10	88.6	
2	Lamar Jackson	QB	2018–present	146	241	1,753	10	7	84.6	
3	Trent Dilfer	QB	2000	35	73	590	3	1	83.7	
4	Tyler Huntley	QB	2020–2023; 2025–present	23	42	286	2	1	82.0	
5	Elvis Grbac	QB	2001	30	55	286	1	3	52.5	

=== Rushing (playoffs) ===
No.	Player	Position	Years	Attempts	Yards	Touchdowns	Yards per carry	Ref.
1	Ray Rice	RB	2008–2013	191	750	5	3.9	
2	Lamar Jackson	QB	2018–present	94	641	3	6.8	
3	Jamal Lewis	RB	2000–2006	130	426	4	3.3	
4	Willis McGahee	RB	2007–2010	75	271	6	3.6	
5	Derrick Henry	RB	2024–present	42	270	3	6.4	

=== Receiving yards (playoffs) ===
No.	Player	Position	Years	Reception	Yards	Average	Touchdowns	Ref.
1	Anquan Boldin	WR	2010–2012	38	616	16.2	6	
2	Torrey Smith	WR	2011–2014	20	414	20.7	4	
3	Todd Heap	TE	2001–2010	32	385	12.0	2	
4	Marquise Brown	WR	2019–2021	18	322	17.9	0	
5	Mark Andrews	TE	2018–present	29	315	10.9	0	

=== Tackles (playoffs) ===
No.	Player	Position	Years	Combined	Solo	Assist	Ref.
1	Ray Lewis	LB	1996–2012	218	137	81	
2	Terrell Suggs	OLB	2003–2018	76	52	24	
3	Dannell Ellerbe	LB	2009–2012	55	41	14	
4	Ed Reed	S	2002–2012	43	6	49	
5	Haloti Ngata	DT	2006–2014	45	30	15	

=== Sacks (playoffs) ===
No.	Player	Position	Years	Sacks	Ref.
1	Terrell Suggs	OLB	2003–2018	12.5	
2	Paul Kruger	DE	2009–2012	6.0	
3	Michael McCrary	DE	1997–2002	6.0	
4	Haloti Ngata	DT	2006–2014	3.5	
5	Peter Boulware	OLB	1997–2005	3.0	
5	Nnamdi Madubuike	DT	2020–present	3.0	
5	Jamie Sharper	OLB	1997–2001	3.0	

=== Interceptions (playoffs) ===
No.	Player	Position	Season	Interceptions	Yards	Touchdowns	Ref.
1	Ed Reed	S	2002–2012	9	168	1	
2	Duane Starks	CB	1998–2001	4	119	1	
3	Chris McAlister	CB	1999–2008	3	22	0	
4	Ladarius Webb	CB	2009–2017	3	1	0	
5	Dawan Landry	S	2006–2010	2	76	0	

== Overall head-to-head record vs. NFL teams ==
Below is table of the Baltimore Ravens head-to-head franchise record as of January 29, 2026.

Regular season record								Playoffs record						
Opponent	Pld	W	L	T	W-L%	PF	PA	Pld	W	L	T	W-L%	PF	PA
Arizona Cardinals	8	6	2	0	.750	180	158	0	0	0	0	.000	0	0
Atlanta Falcons	7	5	2	0	.714	153	101	0	0	0	0	.000	0	0
Buffalo Bills	12	7	5	0	.583	299	203	1	0	2	0	.000	17	24
Carolina Panthers	7	3	4	0	.429	153	122	0	0	0	0	.000	0	0
Chicago Bears	8	4	4	0	.500	147	126	0	0	0	0	.000	0	0
Cincinnati Bengals	60	33	27	0	.550	1,374	1,179	1	0	1	0	.000	17	24
Cleveland Browns	54	39	15	0	.722	1,314	876	0	0	0	0	.000	0	0
Dallas Cowboys	7	6	1	0	.857	200	132	0	0	0	0	.000	0	0
Denver Broncos	15	9	6	0	.600	346	278	2	2	0	0	1.000	59	38
Detroit Lions	8	6	2	0	.750	233	145	0	0	0	0	.000	0	0
Green Bay Packers	8	3	5	0	.375	206	163	0	0	0	0	.000	0	0
Houston Texans	14	11	3	0	.786	362	260	2	2	0	0	1.000	54	23
Indianapolis Colts	15	6	9	0	.400	307	345	3	1	2	0	.333	33	44
Jacksonville Jaguars	24	11	13	0	.458	491	524	0	0	0	0	.000	0	0
Kansas City Chiefs	13	4	9	0	.308	271	346	2	1	1	0	.500	40	24
Las Vegas Raiders	13	8	5	0	.615	351	251	1	1	0	0	1.000	16	3
Los Angeles Chargers	15	10	5	0	.667	337	275	1	0	1	0	.000	17	23
Los Angeles Rams	10	6	4	0	.600	248	188	0	0	0	0	.000	0	0
Miami Dolphins	18	10	8	0	.556	467	302	2	2	0	0	1.000	47	12
Minnesota Vikings	8	5	3	0	.625	214	197	0	0	0	0	.000	0	0
New England Patriots	12	3	10	0	.231	285	365	4	2	2	0	.500	112	85
New Orleans Saints	8	6	2	0	.750	222	165	0	0	0	0	.000	0	0
New York Giants	8	5	3	0	.625	209	159	1	1	0	0	1.000	34	7
New York Jets	12	11	2	0	.846	295	175	0	0	0	0	.000	0	0
Philadelphia Eagles	7	3	3	1	.500	155	134	0	0	0	0	.000	0	0
Pittsburgh Steelers	60	25	35	0	.417	1,172	1,199	5	2	3	0	.400	106	112
San Francisco 49ers	7	5	2	0	.714	162	118	1	1	0	0	1.000	34	31
Seattle Seahawks	7	4	3	0	.571	171	168	0	0	0	0	.000	0	0
Tampa Bay Buccaneers	8	6	2	0	.750	190	139	0	0	0	0	.000	0	0
Tennessee Titans	22	11	11	0	.500	420	370	5	3	2	0	.600	86	81
Washington Commanders	8	5	3	0	.625	163	134	0	0	0	0	.000	0	0
Total	485	276	208	1	.637	11,907	9,848	31	18	13	0	.581	658	524

== See also ==
- List of National Football League records (individual)

== Notes ==
Notes

Footnotes
