= Shedrick Jackson =

American football player (born 1999)

No. 30 – Arizona Cardinals
- Position: Wide receiver
- Roster status: Practice squad

Personal information
- Born: October 20, 1999 (age 27); Hoover, Alabama, U.S.
- Listed height: 6 ft 1 in (1.85 m)
- Listed weight: 198 lb (90 kg)

Career information
- High school: Hoover
- College: Auburn (2018–2022)
- NFL draft: 2023: undrafted

Career history
- Cincinnati Bengals (2023–2024); Las Vegas Raiders (2024–2025); Baltimore Ravens (2026)*; Arizona Cardinals (2026–present)*
- * Offseason or practice squad member only

Career NFL statistics as of 2025
- Receptions: 4
- Receiving yards: 56
- Receiving touchdowns: 1
- Stats at Pro Football Reference

Shedrick Jackson (born October 20, 1999) is an American professional football wide receiver for the Arizona Cardinals of the National Football League (NFL). He played college football for the Auburn Tigers and was signed by the Cincinnati Bengals as an undrafted free agent in 2023.

== Early life ==
Jackson was born on October 20, 1999, in Hoover, Alabama. He is the great-nephew of Heisman Trophy winner, National Football League (NFL) and Major League Baseball (MLB) player Bo Jackson. He attended Hoover High School in his hometown. As a sophomore in 2015, he caught 20 passes for 406 yards and four touchdowns while helping them reach the Class 7A state semifinals.

The following year, he had 43 receptions for 661 yards and three touchdowns as Hoover won the class championship. Prior to his senior year in 2017, Jackson committed to play college football for the Auburn Tigers, the same school his great-uncle attended. On3.com ranked him a four-star recruit and the 343rd-best player nationally, while 247Sports ranked him three-stars and 392nd in the nation. He ended his senior year with 48 receptions for 979 yards and nine touchdowns while helping Hoover repeat as class champions. He was invited to the Alabama–Mississippi All-Star Game.

== College career ==
As a true freshman at Auburn in 2018, Jackson appeared in two games and totaled two receptions for 15 yards. In 2019, he played nine games and started five, having two receptions for 31 yards and scoring a two-point conversion. He had six receptions for 84 yards in 2020 while also being selected to the Southeastern Conference (SEC) Academic Honor Roll. After having caught just 10 passes for 130 yards in his first three years, Jackson had a breakout season in 2021, being Auburn's second-leading receiver with 40 catches for 527 yards and a touchdown; his touchdown was described as "arguably the Tigers' most important touchdown of the season," as it was a game-winning score on fourth-and-goal in the final minute against Georgia State. He returned for a final season in 2022, after having been given another year of eligibility due to the COVID-19 pandemic. He recorded 16 receptions for 217 yards in 2022. He ended his collegiate career with 66 catches for 874 yards and a touchdown.

				Receiving					Rushing				
Season	Team	G	GS	Rec	Yds	Avg	TD	Long	Car	Yds	Avg	TD	Long
2018	Auburn	11	1	2	15	7.5	0	9	-	-	-	-	-
2019	Auburn	9	5	2	31	15.5	0	25	-	-	-	-	-
2020	Auburn	8	8	6	84	14.0	0	37	-	-	-	-	-
2021	Auburn	13	6	40	527	13.2	1	48	-	-	-	-	-
2022	Auburn	12	9	16	217	13.6	0	43	1	12	12.0	0	12
Total		53	29	66	874	13.2	1	48	1	12	12.0	0	12

== Professional career ==
Pre-draft measurables
Height	Weight	Arm length	Hand span	Wingspan	40-yard dash	10-yard split	20-yard split	20-yard shuttle	Three-cone drill	Vertical jump	Broad jump	Bench press
6 ft 1 1/4 in (1.86 m)	193 lb (88 kg)	30 1/4 in (0.77 m)	8 1/2 in (0.22 m)	6 ft 1 1/8 in (1.86 m)	4.31 s	1.50 s	2.32 s	4.30 s	7.10 s	38.5 in (0.98 m)	11 ft 2 in (3.40 m)	13 reps
All values from Pro Day

=== Cincinnati Bengals ===
After going unselected in the 2023 NFL draft, he was signed by the Cincinnati Bengals as an undrafted free agent. He was released at the final roster cuts, on August 29, and then was re-signed to the practice squad the next day.

Jackson was elevated to the active roster for the team's Week 10 game against the Houston Texans and made his NFL debut in the 30–27 loss, recording one tackle on special teams. Following the end of the 2023 regular season, the Bengals signed him to a reserve/future contract on January 8, 2024.

Jackson was waived by the Bengals on August 27, 2024, and re-signed to the practice squad. He was released on September 17.

=== Las Vegas Raiders ===
Jackson was signed to the Las Vegas Raiders practice squad on December 4, 2024. He signed a reserve/future contract with Las Vegas on January 6, 2025.

On August 26, 2025, Jackson was waived by the Raiders as part of final roster cuts and re-signed to the practice squad the next day. During a Week 14 matchup against the Denver Broncos on December 7, Jackson recorded his first NFL reception and touchdown on the same play on a pass by Kenny Pickett. He was signed to the active roster on December 24.

On August 30, 2026, Jackson was waived by the Raiders as a part of final roster cuts.

=== Baltimore Ravens ===
On September 22, 2026, Jackson was signed to the Baltimore Ravens' practice squad. On September 29, he was waived.

=== Arizona Cardinals ===
On October 14, 2026, Jackson signed with the Arizona Cardinals practice squad.

== NFL career statistics ==
Legend
**Bold**	Career high

=== Regular season ===
Year	Team	Games		Receiving					Rushing					Tackles					Fumbles				
Year	Team	GP	GS	Rec	Yds	Avg	Lng	TD	Att	Yds	Avg	Lng	TD	Cmb	Solo	Ast	Sck	TFL	FF	Fum	FR	Yds	TD
2023	CIN	**5**	0	0	0	0.0	0	0	0	0	0.0	0	0	**1**	**1**	0	0	0	0	0	0	0	0
2025	LV	**5**	0	**4**	**56**	**14.0**	**25**	**1**	**1**	**3**	**3.0**	**3**	0	**1**	**1**	0	0	0	0	0	0	0	0
Career		10	0	4	56	14.0	25	1	1	3	3.0	3	0	0	0	0	0	0	0	0	0	0	0
