= Nick Scott (American football) =

American football player (born 1995)

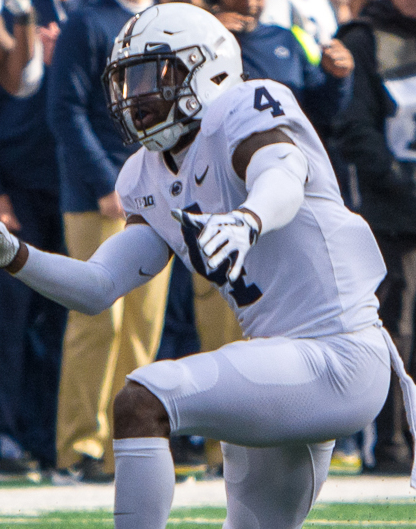
- Scott with the Penn State Nittany Lions in 2018

No. 21 – Carolina Panthers
- Position: Safety
- Roster status: Active

Personal information
- Born: May 17, 1995 (age 31); Lancaster, Pennsylvania, U.S.
- Listed height: 5 ft 11 in (1.80 m)
- Listed weight: 200 lb (91 kg)

Career information
- High school: Fairfax (VA)
- College: Penn State (2014–2018)
- NFL draft: 2019: 7th round, 243rd overall pick

Career history
- Los Angeles Rams (2019–2022); Cincinnati Bengals (2023); Carolina Panthers (2024–present)

Awards and highlights
- Super Bowl champion (LVI)

Career NFL statistics as of 2025
- Total tackles: 355
- Forced fumbles: 2
- Fumble recoveries: 2
- Pass deflections: 14
- Interceptions: 5
- Stats at Pro Football Reference

Nicholas Michael Scott (born May 17, 1995) is an American professional football safety for the Carolina Panthers of the National Football League (NFL). He played college football for the Penn State Nittany Lions and was selected by the Los Angeles Rams in the seventh round of the 2019 NFL draft.

== High School Career ==
Scott played football at Brookline High School in Brookline, Massachusetts during his freshman year. Then his family moved to Virginia, and he played for Fairfax.

== College career ==
Scott started his redshirt freshman year at Penn State as a multi-purpose running back, rushing for 133 yards, catching 4 passes for 43 yards, and returning 13 kickoffs for 310. The following season, he was converted to cornerback. He spent most of the season as a backup, but also returned 6 kickoffs for 138 yards. In his final two seasons, he settled into his permanent position as a safety. As a senior, he recorded 65 tackles, 1 sack, 1 fumble recovery, and tied for the team lead with 3 interceptions.

== Professional career ==
Pre-draft measurables
Height	Weight	Arm length	Hand span	Wingspan	40-yard dash	10-yard split	20-yard split	20-yard shuttle	Three-cone drill	Vertical jump	Broad jump	Bench press
5 ft 10 3/4 in (1.80 m)	200 lb (91 kg)	31 in (0.79 m)	8 1/2 in (0.22 m)	6 ft 4 in (1.93 m)	4.45 s	1.53 s	2.56 s	4.20 s	7.02 s	41.0 in (1.04 m)	10 ft 8 in (3.25 m)	18 reps
All values from Pro Day

=== Los Angeles Rams ===
==== 2019 ====
Scott was drafted by the Los Angeles Rams in the seventh round (243rd overall) of the 2019 NFL draft. He made his first career offensive reception on a 23-yard fake punt pass from Rams punter Johnny Hekker in a 37–10 win over the Atlanta Falcons during the 2019 season.

==== 2020 ====
Scott was placed on the reserve/COVID-19 list by the Rams on December 18, 2020. He was re-activated on December 22.

==== 2021 ====
Scott made his first career interception during the Rams' win at Seattle on October 7, 2021. He became the Rams' starting strong safety for their playoff run after a season-ending injury to Jordan Fuller in the Rams' Week 18 game against the San Francisco 49ers. Scott made his first career postseason interception during the Rams' 30–27 victory in the Divisional Round against the Tampa Bay Buccaneers. Scott helped the Rams reach Super Bowl LVI where they defeated the Cincinnati Bengals 23–20 with Scott recording 2 tackles in the game.

==== 2022 ====
Scott was named the starting free safety for the 2022 season. On January 7, 2023, Scott was placed on injured reserve. He finished the season with a career-high 86 tackles, two interceptions, five passes defensed, and two forced fumbles through 16 starts.

=== Cincinnati Bengals ===
On March 20, 2023, Scott signed a three-year contract with the Bengals. He was named the starting strong safety to begin the season. In Week 9 against the Buffalo Bills, Scott make an aggressive tackle on Bills' tight end Dalton Kincaid that led to Kincaid dropping the football. Scott scooped the ball up for his first career fumble recovery early in the 4th quarter. The Bengals went on to win the game with a score of 24–18.

Scott was benched in favor of rookie Jordan Battle early in the Bengals' Week 11 contest against the Baltimore Ravens after missing nine tackles. Bengals defensive coordinator Lou Anarumo named Battle the starter for the remainder of the season ahead of their matchup with the Pittsburgh Steelers the following week, relegating Scott to a substitution role in the defense.

On March 13, 2024, Scott was released by the Bengals.

=== Carolina Panthers ===
==== 2024 ====
On March 22, 2024, Scott signed with the Carolina Panthers. He played in 10 games with four starts, recording 30 tackles and two passes defensed.

==== 2025 ====
On March 22, 2025, Scott re-signed with the Panthers on a one-year deal. He was named the starting free safety in 2025, starting all 17 games while recording a career-high 111 tackles (second on the team), three passes defensed, and one interception.

==== 2026 ====
On March 14, 2026, Scott re-signed with the Panthers on a one-year contract worth up to $3.25 million.

== NFL career statistics ==
Legend
	Won the Super Bowl
**Bold**	Career high

=== Regular season ===
Year	Team	Games		Tackles					Interceptions						Fumbles				
Year	Team	GP	GS	Cmb	Solo	Ast	Sck	TFL	Int	Yds	Avg	Lng	TD	PD	FF	Fum	FR	Yds	TD
2019	LAR	16	0	8	6	2	0.0	0	0	0	0.0	0	0	0	0	0	0	0	0
2020	LAR	15	0	16	11	5	0.0	0	0	0	0.0	0	0	0	0	0	0	0	0
2021	LAR	**17**	1	47	28	19	0.0	0	**2**	**3**	**1.5**	**3**	0	4	0	0	0	0	0
2022	LAR	16	16	86	56	30	0.0	**1**	**2**	0	0.0	0	0	**5**	**2**	0	0	0	0
2023	CIN	**17**	10	57	35	22	0.0	**1**	0	0	0.0	0	0	0	0	0	**1**	0	0
2024	CAR	10	4	30	16	14	0.0	0	0	0	0.0	0	0	2	0	0	0	0	0
2025	CAR	**17**	**17**	**111**	**64**	**47**	0.0	0	1	0	0.0	0	0	3	0	0	**1**	0	0
Career		108	48	355	216	139	0.0	2	5	3	0.6	3	0	14	2	0	2	0	0

=== Postseason ===
Year	Team	Games		Tackles					Interceptions						Fumbles				
Year	Team	GP	GS	Cmb	Solo	Ast	Sck	TFL	Int	Yds	Avg	Lng	TD	PD	FF	Fum	FR	Yds	TD
2020	LAR	2	1	6	3	3	0.0	0	0	0	0.0	0	0	1	0	0	0	0	0
2021	LAR	**4**	**4**	**14**	**11**	3	0.0	0	**1**	0	0.0	0	0	**3**	0	0	0	0	0
2025	CAR	1	1	9	4	**5**	0.0	0	0	0	0.0	0	0	0	0	0	0	0	0
Career		7	6	29	18	11	0.0	0	1	0	0.0	0	0	4	0	0	0	0	0
