= D. J. Ivey =

American football player (born 2000)

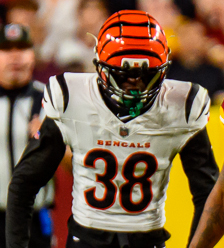
- Ivey with the Cincinnati Bengals in 2025

No. 38 – Cincinnati Bengals
- Position: Cornerback
- Roster status: Active

Personal information
- Born: February 25, 2000 (age 26); Miami Beach, Florida, U.S.
- Listed height: 6 ft 1 in (1.85 m)
- Listed weight: 192 lb (87 kg)

Career information
- High school: Homestead Senior (Homestead, Florida); South Dade Senior (Homestead, Florida)
- College: Miami (FL) (2018–2022)
- NFL draft: 2023: 7th round, 246th overall pick

Career history
- Cincinnati Bengals (2023–present)

Career NFL statistics as of 2025
- Total tackles: 24
- Fumble recoveries: 1
- Pass deflections: 6
- Stats at Pro Football Reference

D. J. Ivey (born February 25, 2000) is an American professional football cornerback for the Cincinnati Bengals of the National Football League (NFL). He played college football for the Miami Hurricanes and was selected by the Bengals in the seventh round (246th overall) of the 2023 NFL draft

== Early life ==
Ivey was born on February 25, 2000, and grew up in Florida City, Florida. He first attended Homestead High School before transferring to South Dade. He posted six interceptions as a senior and was ranked a four-star recruit by 247Sports, committing to play college football for the Miami Hurricanes after graduating.

== College career ==
As a true freshman at Miami in 2018, Ivey appeared in 11 games, playing mostly on special teams while recording three tackles. The following year, he played 12 games, six as a starter, and posted 25 tackles. He also made three interceptions, leading the team. In 2020, Ivey started all 11 games and tallied 36 tackles with four pass breakups.

Ivey only started four of the 12 games he played in 2021, making 25 tackles, one sack and two TFLs, as well as one pass breakup. In his final season, he totaled 38 tackles, seven pass breakups and two interceptions. He finished his stint at Miami with 127 tackles, 17 pass breakups, six interceptions and two fumbles forced in 58 games played, 32 of which he started.

== Professional career ==
Pre-draft measurables
Height	Weight	Arm length	Hand span	Wingspan	40-yard dash	10-yard split	20-yard split	20-yard shuttle	Three-cone drill	Vertical jump	Broad jump	Bench press
6 ft 0 1/2 in (1.84 m)	194 lb (88 kg)	32 5/8 in (0.83 m)	9 1/4 in (0.23 m)	6 ft 5 1/2 in (1.97 m)	4.46 s	1.59 s	2.59 s	4.21 s	7.19 s	39.0 in (0.99 m)	10 ft 6 in (3.20 m)	12 reps
All values from Pro Day

Ivey was selected in the seventh round (246th overall) of the 2023 NFL draft by the Cincinnati Bengals. Despite the late selection, he was named to the Bengals' 53-man roster following the preseason. He was named the fourth cornerback on the depth chart to begin the season.

During the first quarter of the Bengals' Week 15 matchup with the Minnesota Vikings, Ivey suffered a non-contact knee injury and was carted off the field. He was placed on injured reserve on December 18, 2023.

Ivey began the 2024 season on the reserve/physically unable to perform list while recovering from his knee injury. He was activated on October 19.

== NFL career statistics ==
Legend
**Bold**	Career high

=== Regular season ===
Year	Team	Games		Tackles					Interceptions						Fumbles				
Year	Team	GP	GS	Cmb	Solo	Ast	Sck	TFL	Int	Yds	Avg	Lng	TD	PD	FF	Fum	FR	Yds	TD
2023	CIN	8	0	3	3	0	0.0	0	0	0	0.0	0	0	1	0	0	**1**	0	0
2024	CIN	11	0	4	4	0	0.0	0	0	0	0.0	0	0	2	0	**1**	0	0	0
2025	CIN	17	0	**17**	**10**	**7**	0.0	0	0	0	0.0	0	0	**3**	0	0	0	0	0
Career		36	0	24	17	7	0.0	0	0	0	0.0	0	0	6	0	1	1	0	0
