= Jordan Battle =

American football player (born 2000)

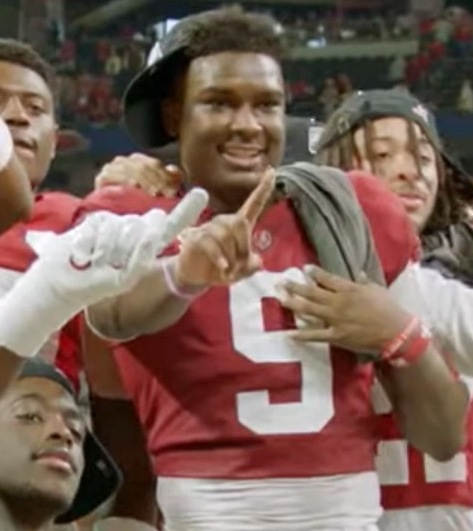
- Battle with the Alabama Crimson Tide in 2021

No. 27 – Cincinnati Bengals
- Position: Safety
- Roster status: Active

Personal information
- Born: December 14, 2000 (age 25); Fort Lauderdale, Florida, U.S.
- Listed height: 6 ft 1 in (1.85 m)
- Listed weight: 215 lb (98 kg)

Career information
- High school: St. Thomas Aquinas (Fort Lauderdale)
- College: Alabama (2019–2022)
- NFL draft: 2023: 3rd round, 95th overall pick

Career history
- Cincinnati Bengals (2023–present)

Awards and highlights
- PFWA All-Rookie Team (2023); CFP national champion (2020); 2× Third-team All-American (2021, 2022); 2× First-team All-SEC (2021, 2022)

Career NFL statistics as of Week 10, 2026
- Total tackles: 312
- Sacks: 2.0
- Pass deflections: 22
- Interceptions: 9
- Fumble recoveries: 1
- Forced fumble: 3
- Stats at Pro Football Reference

Jordan Battle (born December 14, 2000) is an American professional football safety for the Cincinnati Bengals of the National Football League (NFL). He played college football for the Alabama Crimson Tide.

== Early life ==
Battle attended St. Thomas Aquinas High School in Fort Lauderdale, Florida. As a senior he had 27 tackles, three interceptions and a sack. He played in the 2019 Under Armour All-America Game. He originally committed to play college football at Ohio State University but changed his commitment to the University of Alabama.

== College career ==
Battle played in 13 games and made four starts as a freshman in 2019. He had 30 tackles, one interception and one sack. Battle returned his sophomore year in 2020 as a starter. Battle was ejected from the 2021 College Football Playoff National Championship game for targeting.

== Professional career ==
=== Pre-draft ===
Following the conclusion of the pre-draft process, NFL media analyst Daniel Jeremiah had Battle ranked as the third best safety prospect (96th overall) in the draft. NFL.com analyst Bucky Brooks ranked him third amongst all safeties available in the draft. ESPN draft analyst Jeff Legwold ranked Battle third amongst all safety prospects (75th overall) in the draft. Scouts Inc. had him listed as the fifth best safety (87th overall) on their big board. Pro Football Focus and Sports Illustrated had Battle ranked as the fourth best prospect (82nd overall) amongst his position group in the draft. NFL draft analyst Lance Zierlein projected him to be selected in the third round of the NFL Draft.

Pre-draft measurables
Height	Weight	Arm length	Hand span	Wingspan	40-yard dash	10-yard split	20-yard split	20-yard shuttle	Three-cone drill	Vertical jump	Broad jump	Bench press
6 ft 1 in (1.85 m)	209 lb (95 kg)	32 in (0.81 m)	8 1/2 in (0.22 m)	6 ft 2 5/8 in (1.90 m)	4.55 s	1.56 s	2.62 s	4.37 s	7.31 s	29.5 in (0.75 m)	9 ft 6 in (2.90 m)	17 reps
All values from NFL Combine/Pro Day

=== 2023 ===
The Cincinnati Bengals selected Battle in the third round (95th overall) of the 2023 NFL draft. He was the fifth safety drafted in 2023. The Bengals selected Battle to possibility become a starting safety following the departures of starting safeties Vonn Bell and Jessie Bates.

External videos
- Bengals select Jordan Battle No. 95

On May 12, 2023, the Cincinnati Bengals signed Battle to a four—year, $5.32 million contract that includes an initial signing bonus of $872,740.

He entered training camp as the primary backup safety, but earned significant experience after Nick Scott sustained a shoulder injury that hampered his participation in camp. Head coach Zac Taylor named Battle the primary backup strong safety on the depth chart to begin the regular season behind Nick Scott and starting free safety Daxton Hill.

On September 10, 2023, Battle made his professional regular season debut in the Bengals' season-opener at the Cleveland Browns and made one tackle as they lost 3—24. On November 16, 2023, Battle set a season-high with 12 combined tackles (10 solo) during a 30—24 loss at the Baltimore Ravens. His impressive performance earned him the starting strong safety role for the remainder of the season. Defensive coordinator Lou Anarumo stated his decision to start Battle over veteran Nick Scott was due to his stronger tackling abilities. In Week 12, he earned hus first career start and recorded eight combined tackles (three solo) as they lost 10—16 to the Pittsburgh Steelers. The following week, Battle made seven combined tackles (four solo), one pass deflection, and had his first career sack on C. J. Beathard during a 34—31 overtime victory at the Jacksonville Jaguars. On January 7, 2024, Battle made four combined tackles (three solo), two pass deflections, a sack, and had his first career interception on the first pass attempt by Jeff Driskel during a 31—14 win at the Cleveland Browns. He finished his rookie campaign with a total of 71 combined tackles (43 solo), five pass deflections, two sacks, and one interception on 17 games and seven starts. He was named to the PFF and PPWA All-Rookie teams.

=== 2024 ===
Entering training camp, Battle was relegated to a backup safety role after the Bengals signed Geno Stone to takeover as a starter. Head coach Zac Taylor named Battle the primary backup safety to begin the regular season, behind starting tandem Geno Stone and Vonn Bell. Entering Week 12, head coach Zac Taylor promoted Battle to starting free safety for the remainder of the season, replacing Vonn Bell. In Week 15, he set a season-high with ten combined tackles (five solo) and had his first career fumble recovery before returning it for 60-yards for what was initially ruled a touchdown. However, Battle inadvertently dropped the ball inches before crossing the goal line, sending the ball flying out the end zone for what was ultimately ruled a touchback as the Bengals defeated the Tennessee Titans 37–27. On December 22, 2024, Battle made seven combined tackles (six solo), one pass deflection, and made his lone interception of the season on a pass thrown by Dorian Thompson-Robinson to tight end David Njoku during a 24–6 victory against the Cleveland Browns. He finished the season with 58 combined tackles (35 solo), three pass deflections, a fumble recovery, and one interception in 17 games and six starts.

=== 2025 ===
He entered training camp slated as a starting safety following the departure of Vonn Bell. The Bengals' new defensive coordinator Al Golden named Battle and Geno Stone the starting safeties to start the regular season.

== NFL career statistics ==
Legend
**Bold**	Career high

=== Regular season ===
Year	Team	Games		Tackles					Interceptions						Fumbles				
Year	Team	GP	GS	Cmb	Solo	Ast	Sck	TFL	Int	Yds	Avg	Lng	TD	PD	FF	Fum	FR	Yds	TD
2023	CIN	17	7	71	43	28	**2.0**	**4**	1	0	0.0	0	0	5	0	0	0	0	0
2024	CIN	17	6	58	35	23	0.0	1	1	0	0.0	0	0	3	0	**1**	**1**	**60**	0
2025	CIN	17	17	**125**	**62**	**63**	0.0	2	**4**	6	1.5	4	0	6	**2**	0	0	0	0
2026	CIN	9	9	58	40	18	0.0	2	3	**18**	**6.0**	**11**	0	**8**	1	0	0	0	0
Career		60	39	312	180	132	2.0	9	9	24	2.6	11	0	22	3	1	1	60	0
