= Patriots–Ravens rivalry =

American football rivalry

- New England Patriots Baltimore Ravens
- Location: Foxborough, Baltimore
- First meeting: October 6, 1996; Patriots 48, Ravens 38
- Latest meeting: December 21, 2025; Patriots 28, Ravens 24
- Next meeting: TBD (no later than the 2028 regular season)
- Stadiums: Patriots: Gillette Stadium; Ravens: M&T Bank Stadium

Statistics
- Total meetings: 17
- All-time series: Patriots: 12–5
- Regular season series: Patriots: 10–3
- Postseason results: Tie: 2–2
- Largest victory: Patriots: 41–7 (2013); Ravens: 33–14 (2009)
- Most points scored: Patriots: 46 (1996); Ravens: 38 (1996)
- Longest win streak: Patriots: 5 (1996–2009); Ravens: 2 (2012)
- Current win streak: Patriots: 1 (2025–present)

Post-season history
- 2009 AFC Wild Card: Ravens won: 33–14; 2011 AFC Championship: Patriots won: 23–20; 2012 AFC Championship: Ravens won: 28–13; 2014 AFC Divisional: Patriots won: 35–31

The Patriots–Ravens rivalry is a National Football League (NFL) rivalry between the New England Patriots and the Baltimore Ravens.

As the Patriots play in the AFC East and the Ravens in the AFC North, the two teams do not play every year; instead, they play at least once every three years and at least once every six seasons at each team's home stadium during which their divisions are paired up, sometimes more often if the two teams finish in the same place in their respective divisions or meet in the playoffs. Though the two franchises are in different divisions within the American Football Conference and did not start playing each other until the late 1990s, their rivalry is noted for competitiveness in the playoffs, especially in the late 2000s and early 2010s.

The Patriots lead the overall series, 12–5. The two teams have met four times in the playoffs, with both teams winning twice.

== History ==
The two teams first played each other in 1996, but the rivalry started in earnest in 2007 when the Ravens suffered a bitter 27–24 loss in the Patriots' quest for perfection. The rivalry began to escalate in 2009 when the Ravens lost to the Patriots 27–21 in a game that involved a confrontation between Patriots quarterback Tom Brady and Ravens linebacker Terrell Suggs. Both players would go on to take verbal shots at each other through the media after the game. The Ravens defeated the Patriots in the 2009 AFC Wild Card playoff game, 33–14, marking the first time the Ravens had ever defeated the Patriots. The Ravens faced the Patriots in week six of the 2010 season. The Patriots ended up winning 23–20 in overtime; the game caused controversy from a hit to the helmet of tight end Todd Heap by Patriots safety Brandon Meriweather.

The Ravens played the Patriots for the third consecutive season, this time in the 2011 AFC championship game, which the Patriots won, 23–20. The rivalry reached a new level of friction with this, the second playoff meeting between the two clubs. The Ravens built a 20–16 lead in the fourth quarter, but Patriots quarterback Tom Brady dove into the end zone to make the score 23–20 with around 11 minutes remaining; this proved to be the winning touchdown. On the Ravens' last possession of the game, quarterback Joe Flacco threw a pass to wide receiver Lee Evans in the corner of the end zone that would have given the Ravens the lead, but a last-second strip by Patriots corner Sterling Moore forced the ball from the hands of Evans, forcing the game to be decided on a last-minute field goal by Ravens kicker Billy Cundiff. With 11 seconds remaining on the clock, Cundiff missed the 32-yard field goal attempt, allowing the Patriots to kill the clock on their way to Super Bowl XLVI for a rematch with the New York Giants.

The Ravens' first regular-season win over the Patriots came on September 23, 2012. The game was emotional as receiver Torrey Smith was competing following the death of his brother in a motorcycle accident just the night before. Smith caught two touchdowns in a back and forth game; the Ravens erased a 13–0 deficit in the first half and led 14–13, but the Patriots scored at the end of the second quarter for a 20–14 lead. The lead changed twice in the third quarter and the Patriots led 30–21 in the fourth, but the Ravens scored on Smith's second touchdown catch. The Ravens were stopped on fourth down but the Patriots had to punt; in the final two minutes a pass interference penalty on Devin McCourty put the ball at the Patriots 7-yard line; new Ravens kicker Justin Tucker booted a 27-yard field goal on the final play; the ball sailed directly over the upright and was ruled good; the quality of officiating by replacement referees caused controversy as Bill Belichick angrily reached for one of the referees as they were leaving the field, leading to a $50,000 fine later that week.

The two teams met again in the 2012 AFC Championship, where the Ravens won 28–13. The Patriots led at halftime, 13–7, but the Ravens defense gave up no points in the 2nd half. It was the first time ever that Tom Brady lost a game at home after leading at halftime, and the first time a road team beat the Patriots in the AFC Championship. This win propelled the Ravens to Super Bowl XLVII in which they beat the San Francisco 49ers for their second franchise Lombardi Trophy.

The two teams met once again in the Divisional playoffs on January 10, 2015, at Gillette Stadium. The Patriots trailed by as much as 14 twice, before beating the Ravens 35–31 to advance to the AFC Championship and eventually onto a 28–24 victory against the Seattle Seahawks in Super Bowl XLIX.

On November 3, 2019, the 8–0 Patriots met the 5–2 Ravens at M&T Bank Stadium on Sunday Night Football. The game marked the introduction of Lamar Jackson in the rivalry, who took over as the Ravens quarterback in the middle of the 2018 season. The Ravens came away with a 37–20 victory, handing the Patriots their first loss of the season and beating them for the first time since the 2012 AFC Championship.

== Rivalry statistics ==
	Patriots wins	Ties	Ravens wins	Patriots points	Ravens points
Regular season	10	0	3	366	284
Postseason	2		2	85	112
Total	12	0	5	431	396

== Season-by-season results ==
New England Patriots vs. Baltimore Ravens Season-by-Season Results
1990s – 2000s (Patriots, 5–1)

Season	Results	Location	Overall series	Notes
1996	Patriots; 46–38	Memorial Stadium	Patriots; 1–0	First meeting in the series. Only meeting at Memorial Stadium. Both teams score their most points in a game against one another. Patriots lose Super Bowl XXXI.
1999	Patriots; 20–3	Foxboro Stadium	Patriots; 2–0	Only meeting at Foxboro Stadium.
2004	Patriots; 24–3	Gillette Stadium	Patriots; 3–0	First start for Tom Brady in the series. Patriots win Super Bowl XXXIX.
2007	Patriots; 27–24	M&T Bank Stadium	Patriots; 4–0	The Patriots complete 16–0 regular season. Patriots lose Super Bowl XLII.
2009	Patriots; 27–21	Gillette Stadium	Patriots; 5–0	Joe Flacco makes his first start in the rivalry for the Ravens. The first season the two teams faced off in their rivalry without either team reaching the Super Bowl during a year when Flacco or Brady started at quarterback.
2009 playoffs	Ravens 33–14	Gillette Stadium	Patriots 5–1	AFC Wild Card playoffs. Ravens jumped out to a 24–0 lead in the first quarter, handing Tom Brady the first home postseason loss of his career and giving the Patriots their first home playoff defeat since the 1978 season. Ravens record their largest victory against the Patriots with a 19–point differential. Only playoff matchup in the rivalry where the winner does not advance to the Super Bowl, as the Ravens would lose to the eventual AFC champion Indianapolis Colts in the next round.

2010s (Patriots, 5–3)

Season	Results	Location	Overall series	Notes
2010	Patriots; 23–20 (OT)	Gillette Stadium	Patriots; 6–1	First overtime result in the series.
2011 playoffs	Patriots 23–20	Gillette Stadium	Patriots 7–1	AFC Championship Game. Patriots advance after Ravens' Lee Evans drops go-ahead TD and Billy Cundiff misses game-tying 32-yard FG. Patriots lose Super Bowl XLVI.
2012	Ravens; 31–30	M&T Bank Stadium	Patriots; 7–2	Justin Tucker's 27-yard field goal, which sailed over the right upright, won the game for Baltimore and gave the Ravens their first regular season victory in the series.
2012 playoffs	Ravens 28–13	Gillette Stadium	Patriots 7–3	AFC Championship Game. Ravens handed Tom Brady his first-ever home loss after leading at halftime, ending his perfect 67–0 record in such games. Following their loss, the Patriots went on a 16-game home winning streak. Ravens win Super Bowl XLVII.
2013	Patriots; 41–7	M&T Bank Stadium	Patriots; 8–3	Patriots record their largest victory against the Ravens with a 34–point differential.
2014 playoffs	Patriots 35–31	Gillette Stadium	Patriots 9–3	AFC Divisional playoffs. Patriots overcame two separate 14-point deficits in a game where they controversially lined up receivers inside the tackle box. Although legal at the time, this tactic was later deemed illegal the following season. Patriots win Super Bowl XLIX.
2016	Patriots; 30–23	Gillette Stadium	Patriots; 10–3	Last start for Joe Flacco in the series. Patriots win Super Bowl LI.
2019	Ravens; 37–20	M&T Bank Stadium	Patriots; 10–4	Last start for Tom Brady in the series. The first start for Ravens' QB Lamar Jackson in the series. Ravens' win ended the Patriots 13-game winning streak and handed them their first loss of the season after an 8–0 start.

2020s (Patriots, 2–1)

Season	Results	Location	Overall series	Notes
2020	Patriots; 23–17	Gillette Stadium	Patriots; 11–4	
2022	Ravens; 37–26	Gillette Stadium	Patriots; 11–5	
2025	Patriots; 28–24	M&T Bank Stadium	Patriots; 12–5	Patriots come back from an 11-point deficit in the 4th quarter to clinch a playoff berth. Patriots lose Super Bowl LX.

Summary of Results

Season	Season series	at New England Patriots	at Baltimore Ravens	Notes
Regular season	Patriots 10–3	Patriots 6–1	Patriots 4–2	
Postseason	Tie 2–2	Tie 2–2	No games	AFC Wild Card: 2009; AFC Divisional: 2014; AFC Championship: 2011, 2012
Regular and postseason	Patriots 12–5	Patriots 8–3	Patriots 4–2	

== See also ==
- List of NFL rivalries
