= Devonnsha Maxwell =

American football player (born 1999)

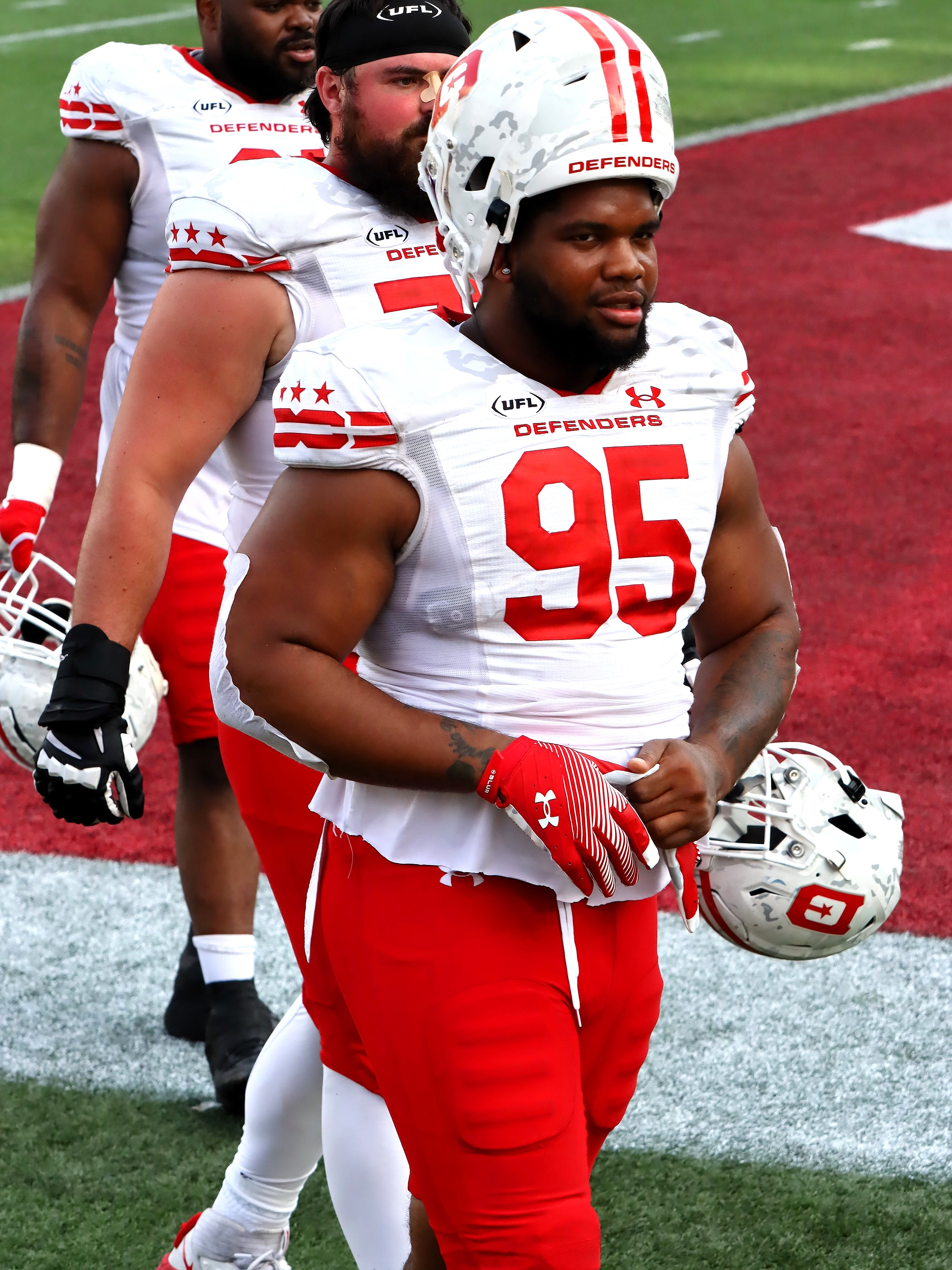
- Maxwell with the DC Defenders in 2025

Profile
- Position: Defensive tackle

Personal information
- Born: May 5, 1999 (age 27); Valdosta, Georgia, U.S.
- Listed height: 6 ft 2 in (1.88 m)
- Listed weight: 284 lb (129 kg)

Career information
- High school: Valdosta
- College: Chattanooga (2018–2022)
- NFL draft: 2023: undrafted

Career history
- Cincinnati Bengals (2023); DC Defenders (2025–2026); Atlanta Falcons (2026)*
- * Offseason or practice squad member only

Awards and highlights
- UFL champion (2025)
- Stats at Pro Football Reference

Devonnsha Jerome Maxwell (born May 5, 1999) is an American professional football defensive tackle. He played college football for the Chattanooga Mocs and was signed by the Cincinnati Bengals as an undrafted free agent in 2023.

== Early life ==
Maxwell was born on May 5, 1999. His mother is Regina Maxwell.

== College career ==
Maxwell played college football at Chattanooga from 2018 to 2022. He earned his college degree in psychology in 2021.

== Professional career ==
Pre-draft measurables
Height	Weight	Arm length	Hand span	Wingspan	40-yard dash	10-yard split	20-yard split	20-yard shuttle	Three-cone drill	Vertical jump	Broad jump	Bench press
6 ft 1 5/8 in (1.87 m)	290 lb (132 kg)	33 1/8 in (0.84 m)	9 3/4 in (0.25 m)	6 ft 7 7/8 in (2.03 m)	5.19 s	1.79 s	2.90 s	4.74 s	7.83 s	28.5 in (0.72 m)	8 ft 10 in (2.69 m)	30 reps
All values from Chattanooga's Pro Day

=== Cincinnati Bengals ===
On May 12, 2023, the Cincinnati Bengals signed Maxwell to a three-year, $2.72 million contract as an undrafted free agent. On August 1, Maxwell was carted off the field after he injured his right knee. He was placed on injured reserve on August 7. Maxwell was released by the Bengals on August 19, 2024.

=== DC Defenders ===
On December 4, 2024, Maxwell signed with the DC Defenders of the United Football League (UFL).

=== Atlanta Falcons ===
On June 17, 2026, Maxwell signed with the Atlanta Falcons. He was waived by the Falcons on August 29.
