= Bengals–Ravens rivalry =

National Football League rivalry

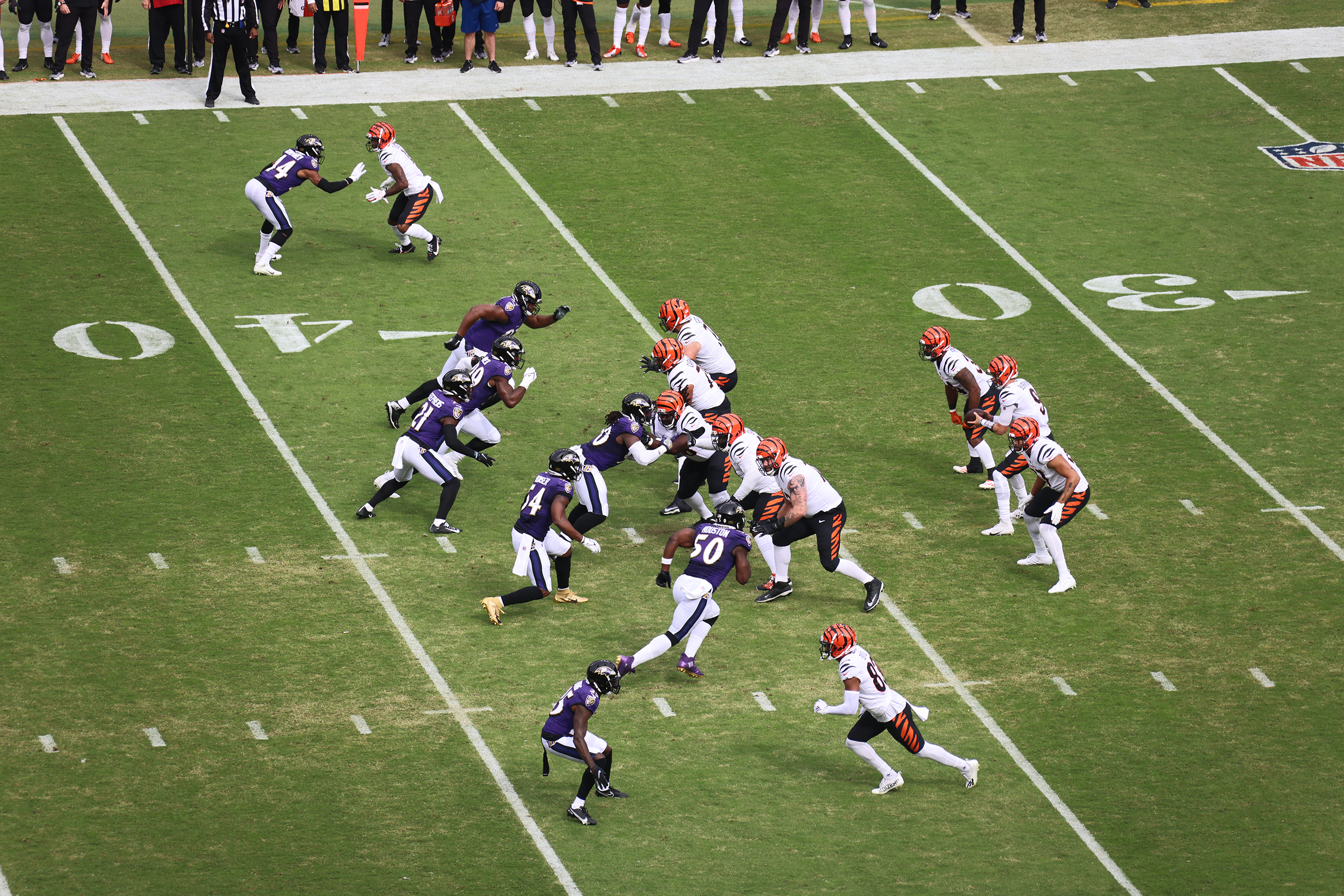
- Bengals and Ravens face off during the 2021 season.

- Cincinnati Bengals Baltimore Ravens
- Location: Cincinnati, Baltimore
- First meeting: November 3, 1996; Bengals 24, Ravens 21
- Latest meeting: October 25, 2026; Bengals 35, Ravens 13
- Next meeting: December 31, 2026
- Stadiums: Bengals: Paycor Stadium; Ravens: M&T Bank Stadium

Statistics
- Total meetings: 62
- All-time series: Ravens: 33–29
- Regular season series: Ravens: 33–28
- Postseason results: Bengals: 1–0
- Largest victory: Bengals: 41–17 (2021); Ravens: 37–0 (2000)
- Most points scored: Bengals: 42 (2005); Ravens: 49 (2019)
- Longest win streak: Bengals: 5 (2013–2015); Ravens: 6 (1998–2000)
- Current win streak: Bengals: 1 (2026–present)

Post-season history
- 2022 AFC Wild Card: Bengals won: 24–17

The Bengals–Ravens rivalry is a National Football League (NFL) rivalry between the Cincinnati Bengals and Baltimore Ravens.

The rivalry began in 1996 when the Ravens were created after the Cleveland Browns, with whom the Bengals also share a rivalry, moved to Baltimore. They were placed in the former AFC Central Division, becoming divisional rivals with the Bengals. Both teams were placed in the AFC North during the 2002 NFL realignment. The rivalry gained intensity in 2003 as the Bengals hired longtime Ravens defensive coordinator Marvin Lewis as head coach.

The Ravens lead the overall series, 33–29. The two teams have met once in the playoffs with the Bengals winning the 2022 AFC Wild Card game.

== Notable games ==
- November 3, 1996: Bengals 24, Ravens 21 In the first game in the history of the series, the Ravens took a 21–3 lead into halftime. The Bengals scored 21 unanswered 2nd half points to win 24–21.
- October 19, 2003: Bengals 34, Ravens 26 This was Bengals' head coach Marvin Lewis' first game against the Ravens. Lewis previously served as the Ravens defensive coordinator from 1996 to 2001, including their Super Bowl XXXV title in 2000.
- December 5, 2004: Bengals 27, Ravens 26 The Bengals overcame a 20–3 fourth quarter deficit to win 27–26.
- September 10, 2007: Bengals 27, Ravens 20 This season-opening Monday Night Football game was best remembered for a touchdown celebration by Bengals' WR Chad Johnson, who is known for his touchdown celebrations. After a score, he donned a gold jacket, resembling the jackets given to Pro Football Hall of Fame inductees, that read "Future H.O.F. 20??" on the back.
- November 10, 2013: Ravens 20, Bengals 17 The Ravens built a 17–0 lead at halftime before the Bengals rallied to make it 17–10 with two seconds left. In the final play of regulation, Bengals quarterback Andy Dalton threw a 49-yard Hail Mary pass. Despite being initially tipped, wide receiver A. J. Green ran toward the ball and caught it to tie the game at 17–17 at the end of regulation. However, the Ravens would win in overtime, 20–17.
- September 7, 2014: Bengals 23, Ravens 16 Bengals kicker Mike Nugent kicked five field goals in the first half, tying an NFL record for most field goals kicked in a half.
- December 31, 2017: Bengals 31, Ravens 27 In the final game of the regular season in Baltimore, Bengals QB Andy Dalton threw a go-ahead touchdown pass to Tyler Boyd in the closing seconds to give the Bengals, finishing at 7-9, an improbable win over the now-9–7 Ravens. This win, combined with a Buffalo Bills win that day, eliminated the Ravens from playoff contention.
- November 18, 2018: Ravens 24, Bengals 21 Ravens start 2018 first round draft pick Lamar Jackson at quarterback for the first time, he breaks the franchise rushing record for a QB with 117 yards. This marked Marvin Lewis' final game in the series, as he left the Cincinnati franchise at the end of the season.
- December 26, 2021: Bengals 41, Ravens 21 In 2021, Cincinnati completed a season-sweep over Baltimore with a 41–21 victory at home. Bengals quarterback Joe Burrow threw for 525 yards in this game, setting a Bengals franchise record.
- January 15, 2023: Bengals 24, Ravens 17 The first playoff game in the rivalry's history occurred in the 2022 AFC Wild Card Round. Ravens backup quarterback Tyler Huntley fumbled at the goalline, and Sam Hubbard returned it 98 yards for a touchdown. Colloquially known as the "Fumble in the Jungle", it was the longest fumble return in NFL postseason history and the difference in a 24–17 Cincinnati victory.
- October 6, 2024: Ravens 41, Bengals 38 Ravens overcome fourth quarter deficit of 10 points to force overtime. Ravens win on a Justin Tucker walk-off field goal. Lamar Jackson and Joe Burrow combine for 740 passing yards.
- November 7, 2024: Ravens 35, Bengals 34 Ravens overcome third quarter deficit of 14 points and take a 35–28 lead into the game's final minute. The Bengals scored a touchdown with 38 seconds remaining on a Joe Burrow pass to Ja'Marr Chase, but failed a go-ahead two-point conversion to allow the Ravens to secure a 35–34 win. Chase recorded 264 receiving yards and three touchdowns in the loss.

== Season-by-season results ==
Cincinnati Bengals vs. Baltimore Ravens Season-by-Season Results
1990s (Ravens, 5–3)

Season	Season series	at Cincinnati Bengals	at Baltimore Ravens	Overall series	Notes
1996	Bengals 2–0	Bengals; 21–14	Bengals; 24–21	Bengals; 2–0	The Cleveland Browns relocate to Baltimore and became the Baltimore Ravens. In Baltimore, Bengals overcame a 21–3 point deficit.
1997	Tie 1–1	Bengals; 16–14	Ravens; 23–10	Bengals; 3–1	
1998	Ravens 2–0	Ravens; 20–13	Ravens; 31–24	Tie; 3–3	Ravens open Ravens Stadium at Camden Yards (now known as M&T Bank Stadium).
1999	Ravens 2–0	Ravens; 34–31	Ravens; 22–0	Ravens; 5–3	Last matchup at the Cinergy Field (previously known as Riverfront Stadium).

2000s (Tie, 10–10)

Season	Season series	at Cincinnati Bengals	at Baltimore Ravens	Overall series	Notes
2000	Ravens 2–0	Ravens; 27–7	Ravens; 37–0	Ravens; 7–3	Bengals open Paul Brown Stadium (now known as Paycor Stadium). In Baltimore, Ravens record their largest victory against the Bengals with a 37–point differential. Starting with their win in Cincinnati, the Ravens went on a 12-game winning streak. Ravens win Super Bowl XXXV.
2001	Tie 1–1	Bengals; 21–10	Ravens; 16–0	Ravens; 8–4	Bengals' win ended the Ravens' 12-game winning streak.
2002	Ravens 2–0	Ravens; 27–23	Ravens; 38–27	Ravens; 10–4	
2003	Tie 1–1	Bengals; 34–26	Ravens; 31–13	Ravens; 11–5	Bengals hire former Ravens defensive coordinator Marvin Lewis as their head coach.
2004	Tie 1–1	Ravens; 23–9	Bengals; 27–26	Ravens; 12–6	In Baltimore, Bengals overcame a 20–3 fourth quarter deficit.
2005	Bengals 2–0	Bengals; 42–29	Bengals; 21–9	Ravens; 12–8	In Cincinnati, Bengals score their most points in a game against the Ravens.
2006	Tie 1–1	Bengals; 13–7	Ravens; 26–20	Ravens; 13–9	
2007	Bengals 2–0	Bengals; 27–20	Bengals; 21–7	Ravens; 13–11	
2008	Ravens 2–0	Ravens; 34–3	Ravens; 17–10	Ravens; 15–11	Ravens draft QB Joe Flacco and hire John Harbaugh as their head coach.
2009	Bengals 2–0	Bengals; 17–7	Bengals; 17–14	Ravens; 15–13	Bengals win all of their division games for the first time in franchise history.

2010s (Tie, 10–10)

Season	Season series	at Cincinnati Bengals	at Baltimore Ravens	Overall series	Notes
2010	Tie 1–1	Bengals; 15–10	Ravens; 13–7	Ravens; 16–14	
2011	Ravens 2–0	Ravens; 24–16	Ravens; 31–24	Ravens; 18–14	Ravens win all of their division games and sweep the AFC North for the first time in franchise history.
2012	Tie 1–1	Bengals; 23–17	Ravens; 44–13	Ravens; 19–15	Both teams finish with 10–6 records, but the Ravens clinch the AFC North based on a better divisional record than the Bengals. Ravens win Super Bowl XLVII.
2013	Tie 1–1	Bengals; 34–17	Ravens; 20–17 (OT)	Ravens; 20–16	First overtime meeting in the series.
2014	Bengals 2–0	Bengals; 27–24	Bengals; 23–16	Ravens; 20–18	In Baltimore, Bengals K Mike Nugent kicks five field goals in the first half, tying the NFL record for most field goals made in a half.
2015	Bengals 2–0	Bengals; 24–16	Bengals; 28–24	Tie; 20–20	
2016	Tie 1–1	Bengals; 27–10	Ravens; 19–14	Tie; 21–21	
2017	Tie 1–1	Ravens; 20–0	Bengals; 31–27	Tie; 22–22	Bengals' win eliminated the Ravens from playoff contention.
2018	Tie 1–1	Bengals; 34–23	Ravens; 24–21	Tie; 23–23	Ravens draft QB Lamar Jackson, who makes his first NFL start in Baltimore.
2019	Ravens 2–0	Ravens; 49–13	Ravens; 23–17	Ravens; 25–23	In Cincinnati, Ravens score their most points in a game against the Bengals.

2020s (Ravens, 8–6)

Season	Season series	at Cincinnati Bengals	at Baltimore Ravens	Overall series	Notes
2020	Ravens 2–0	Ravens; 38–3	Ravens; 27–3	Ravens; 27–23	In Cincinnati, Ravens finished with 404 rushing yards, setting a franchise record for their most rushing yards in a game and fourth-most rushing yards in a game in NFL history.
2021	Bengals 2–0	Bengals; 41–21	Bengals; 41–17	Ravens; 27–25	In Baltimore, Bengals record their largest victory against the Ravens with a 24–point differential. In Cincinnati, Bengals' QB Joe Burrow throws for 525 yards, setting a franchise record for their most passing yards in a game.and fourth-most passing yards in a game in NFL history. Bengals lose Super Bowl LVI.
2022	Tie 1–1	Bengals; 27–16	Ravens; 19–17	Ravens; 28–26	
2022 Playoffs	Bengals 1–0	Bengals; 24–17	—N/a	Ravens; 28–27	AFC Wild Card. In the fourth quarter, Ravens' QB Tyler Huntley lost possession of the ball while attempting a QB sneak at the Bengals' 1-yard line. The fumble was picked up and returned 98 yards by Bengals' DE Sam Hubbard, resulting in the game-winning touchdown.
2023	Ravens 2–0	Ravens; 27–24	Ravens; 34–20	Ravens; 30–27	In Baltimore, Bengals QB Joe Burrow suffered a season-ending wrist injury in the game.
2024	Ravens 2–0	Ravens; 41–38 (OT)	Ravens; 35–34	Ravens; 32–27	In Baltimore, Bengals score a late touchdown but fail the two-point conversion, resulting in a Ravens' win.
2025	Tie 1–1	Ravens; 24–0	Bengals; 32–14	Ravens; 33–28	Game in Baltimore was played on Thanksgiving. In Cincinnati, Baltimore's win eliminated the Bengals from playoff contention.
2026	Bengals 1–0	December 31	Bengals; 35–13	Ravens; 33–29	

Summary of Results

Season	Season series	at Cincinnati Bengals	at Baltimore Ravens	Notes
Regular Season	Ravens 33–28	Bengals 17–13	Ravens 20–11	
Postseason games	Bengals 1–0	Bengals 1–0	no games	AFC Wild Card: 2022
Regular and postseason	Ravens 33–29	Bengals 18–13	Ravens 20–11	

== See also ==
- List of NFL rivalries
- AFC North
