= Jessie Bates =

American football player (born 1997)

Jessie Bates lll
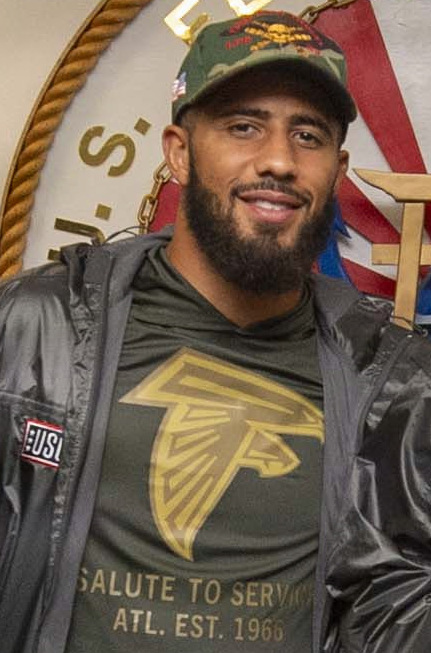
- Bates in 2026

No. 0 – Jacksonville Jaguars
- Position: Safety
- Roster status: Active

Personal information
- Born: February 26, 1997 (age 29); Fort Wayne, Indiana, U.S.
- Listed height: 6 ft 1 in (1.85 m)
- Listed weight: 210 lb (95 kg)

Career information
- High school: Snider (Fort Wayne)
- College: Wake Forest (2015–2017)
- NFL draft: 2018: 2nd round, 54th overall pick

Career history
- Cincinnati Bengals (2018–2022); Atlanta Falcons (2023–2026); Jacksonville Jaguars (2026–present)

Awards and highlights
- 3× Second-team All-Pro (2020, 2023, 2025); Pro Bowl (2023); PFWA All-Rookie Team (2018); Second-team All-ACC (2016)

Career NFL statistics as of Week 9, 2026
- Total tackles: 871
- Sacks: 1.0
- Forced fumbles: 14
- Fumble recoveries: 4
- Pass deflections: 74
- Interceptions: 28
- Defensive touchdowns: 5
- Stats at Pro Football Reference

Jessie Bates III (born February 26, 1997) is an American professional football safety for the Jacksonville Jaguars of the National Football League (NFL). He played college football for the Wake Forest Demon Deacons and was selected by the Cincinnati Bengals in the second round of the 2018 NFL draft. He has also played for the Atlanta Falcons.

== Early life ==
Bates attended Snider High School in Fort Wayne, Indiana. Along with football, he also played basketball. He originally committed to play college football for the Toledo Rockets, but he flipped his commitment to the Wake Forest Demon Deacons in February 2015. Bates is the son of his single mother Theresa and has 6 siblings, his older sister Aaliyah, his younger brother Von and step-siblings Donavan, Nate, Kameron and Ariana.

== College career ==
Bates did not play as a true freshman at Wake Forest in 2015 and chose to redshirt.

As a redshirt freshman in 2016, Bates played in all 13 of Wake Forest's games. He returned 18 punts for 73 yards along with tallying five interceptions (two returned for touchdowns), 100 tackles (3.5 for loss), four pass deflections and one forced fumble. After the season, he was named to the USA Today Freshman All-America Team, the All-Atlantic Coast Conference (ACC) Second-team, and to the ACC All-Freshman First-team.

In 2017, as a redshirt sophomore, Bates played in 11 of Wake Forest's 13 games, missing two due to injury. In those 11 games, he returned eight punts for 161 yards and one touchdown along with recording 79 tackles (six for loss), five pass deflections and one forced fumble. After the season, he declared for the 2018 NFL draft.

== Professional career ==
=== Pre-draft ===
On January 4, 2018, Bates announced his decision to forgo his remaining eligibility and enter the 2018 NFL draft. He attended the NFL Scouting Combine in Indianapolis and completed the majority of combine drills, but opted to skip the bench press. Bates performed well and finished third among safeties in the 60-yard shuttle, fourth among safeties in three-cone drill, and fifth among safeties in the short shuttle. He also earned the ninth best time among his position group in the 40-yard dash and had the tenth best vertical jump.

External videos
- Jessie Bates' NFL Combine Workout

On March 13, 2018, Bates participated at Wake Forest's pro day and performed the bench press and short shuttle (4.25s). He attended pre-draft visits with multiple teams, including the Tennessee Titans, Pittsburgh Steelers, Detroit Lions, and Carolina Panthers. At the conclusion of the pre-draft process, Bates was projected to a second- or third-round pick by NFL draft experts and scouts. He was ranked as the third best free safety prospect in the draft by DraftScout.com, the fourth best safety in the draft by NFL analyst Mike Mayock, and was also ranked as the fifth best safety by Sports Illustrated.

Pre-draft measurables
Height	Weight	Arm length	Hand span	Wingspan	40-yard dash	10-yard split	20-yard split	20-yard shuttle	Three-cone drill	Vertical jump	Broad jump	Bench press
6 ft 1 1/8 in (1.86 m)	200 lb (91 kg)	31 5/8 in (0.80 m)	9 3/4 in (0.25 m)	6 ft 3 3/8 in (1.91 m)	4.50 s	1.56 s	2.63 s	4.25 s	6.78 s	35.5 in (0.90 m)	9 ft 9 in (2.97 m)	12 reps
All values from NFL Combine/Pro Day

=== Cincinnati Bengals ===
The Cincinnati Bengals selected Bates in the second round (54th overall) of the 2018 NFL draft. Bates was the fourth safety drafted in 2018.

External videos
- Bengals draft Jessie Bates 54th overall
- Instant Draft Grade: Jessie Bates III

==== 2018 season ====
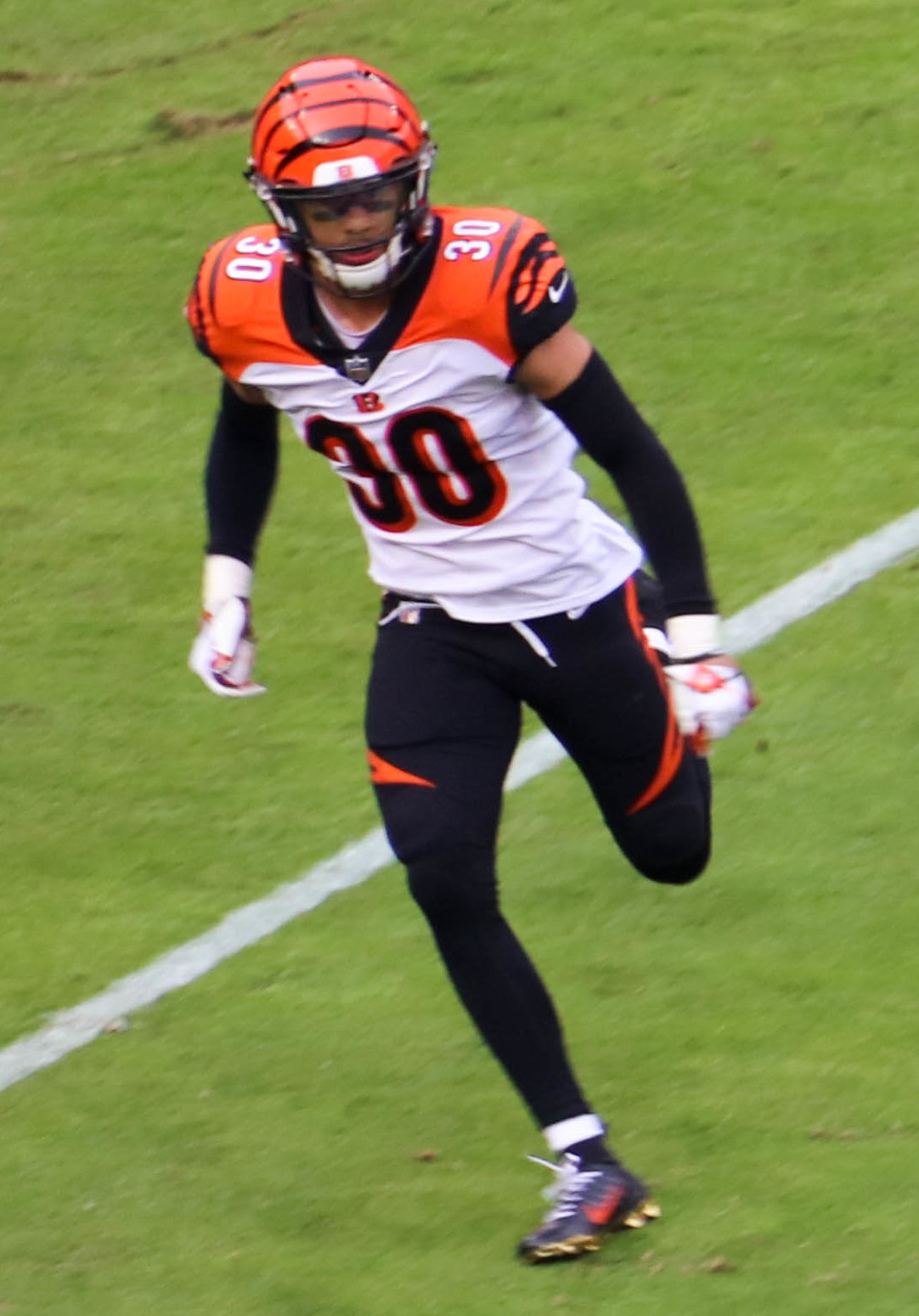
Bates with the Cincinnati Bengals in 2018

On May 12, 2018, the Cincinnati Bengals signed Bates to a four–year, $4.94 million contract that includes $2.38 million guaranteed and a signing bonus of $1.67 million.

He entered training camp slated as a backup safety, but after quickly impressing the Bengals' coaching staff he became a possible candidate to take the role at starting free safety from George Iloka. He became the de facto free safety after Iloka was released on August 19. Head coach Marvin Lewis named Bates and strong safety Shawn Williams the starting safety duo to kick off the regular season.

External videos
- Jessie Bates gets first NFL interception

On September 6, 2018, Bates made his professional regular season debut and first career start in the Bengals' season-opener, recording eight solo tackles in a 34–23 victory at the Indianapolis Colts. On September 13, 2018, Bates recorded three solo tackles, broke up a pass, and made his first-career interception off a pass attempt by Joe Flacco, that was originally intended for wide receiver Michael Crabtree, and returned it for a 21-yard gain during a 34–23 victory against the Baltimore Ravens. In Week 7, he collected a season-high 12 combined tackles (seven solo) during the Bengals' 45–10 loss at the Kansas City Chiefs. On October 28, 2018, Bates recorded six solo tackles, two pass deflections, and intercepted a pass thrown by Jameis Winston to wide receiver Adam Humphries and returned it 21-yards to score his first career touchdown in the Bengals' 37–34 victory against the Tampa Bay Buccaneers. On December 31, 2018, the Cincinnati Bengals fired head coach Marvin Lewis following a 6–10 record. He started all 16 games as a rookie in 2018 and recorded a team-leading 111 combined tackles (73 solo), seven pass deflections, three interceptions, and one touchdown. He was named to the PFWA All-Rookie Team. Pro Football Focus had Bates receive an overall grade of 79.9 in 2018, which ranked 15th among all 163 safeties.

==== 2019 season ====
Bates and Shawn Williams returned as the starting safeties to start the season under new defensive coordinator Lou Anarumo. In Week 7, Bates collected a season-high 12 combined tackles (eight solo) during a 27–17 loss to the Jacksonville Jaguars. In Week 10 against the Baltimore Ravens, Bates recorded his first interception of the season off Robert Griffin III and made eight combined tackles (seven solo) during their 49–13 loss. On December 8, 2019, he made two combined tackles (one solo), a season-high three pass breakups, and had his third interception of the season on a pass thrown by Baker Mayfield to wide receiver KhaDarel Hodge as the Bengals lost 19–27 at the Cleveland Browns. He completed the 2019 NFL season with a total of 100 combined tackles (71 solo), nine pass deflections, three interceptions, a forced fumble, and one fumble recovery while starting all 17 games. He ended 2020 with an overall grade of 61.2 from Pro Football Focus, which ranked 106th out of 168 safeties.

==== 2020 season ====
He returned as the starting free safety to begin the 2020 NFL season, along with starting strong safety Vonn Bell. On November 8, 2020, Bates collected 11 combined tackles (nine solo), tied a season-high with two pass deflections, and intercepted a pass by Ryan Tannehill to A. J. Brown during a 31–20 victory against the Tennessee Titans.

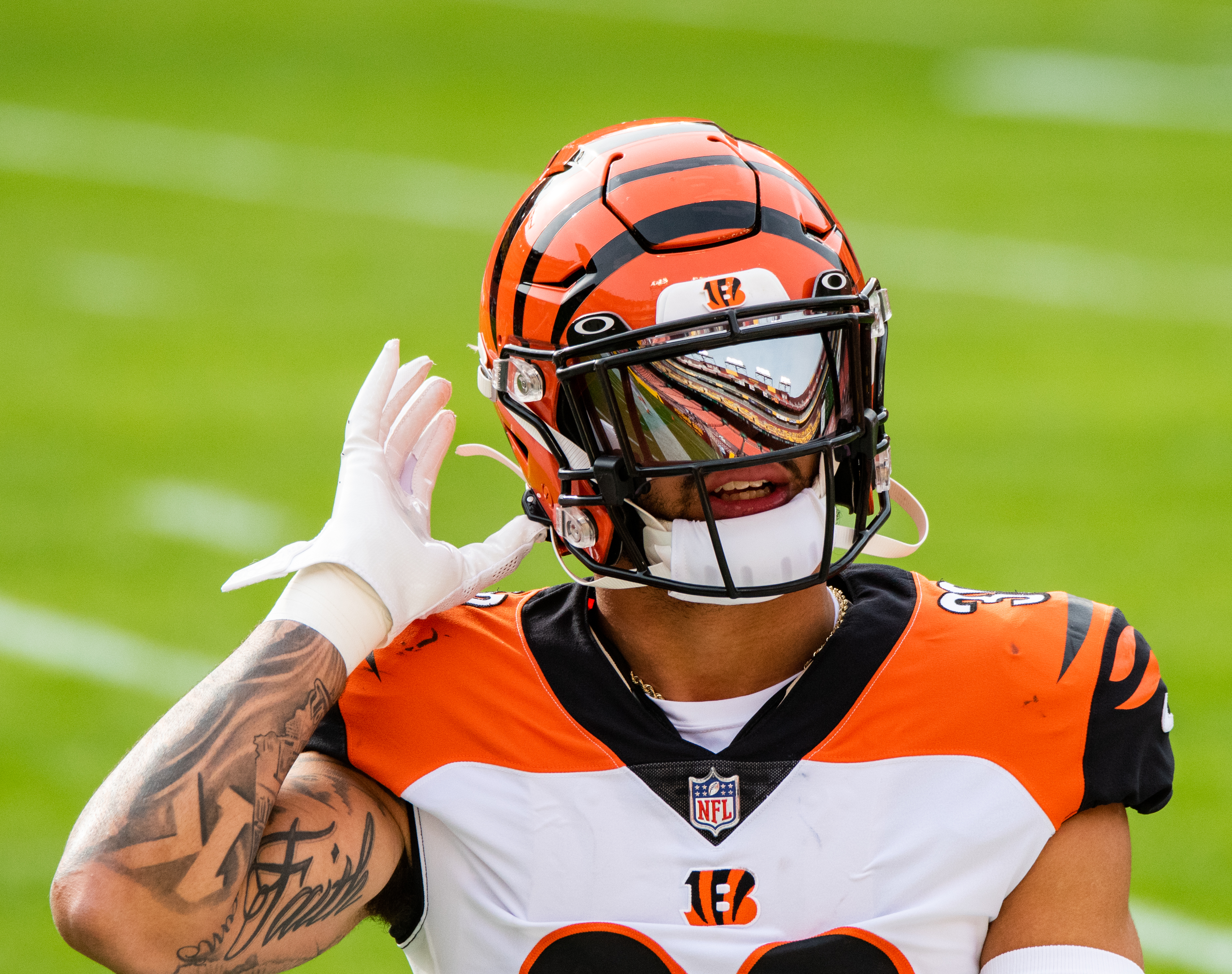
Bates with the Cincinnati Bengals in 2020

In Week 6, Bates recorded his first interception of the season off a pass thrown by Philip Rivers during the 31–27 loss to the Indianapolis Colts. In Week 11 against the Washington Football Team, Bates recorded his third interception of the season off a pass thrown by Alex Smith during the 20–9 loss. In Week 13, he racked up a season-high 13 combined tackles (ten solo) and had his only forced fumble of the season as the Bengals lost 7–13 at the Miami Dolphins. He made a total of 109 combined tackles (78 solo), 13 pass deflections, three interceptions, and one forced fumble while starting all 17 games for his third consecutive complete season. After the season Bates was named a second-team All-Pro. Bates was the highest graded safety in the league out of 172 safeties with an overall grade of 90.1 from Pro Football Focus and a coverage grade of 90.0.

External videos
- Top 100 Players of 2021: 90. Jessie Bates

==== 2021 season ====
Head coach Zac Taylor retained Bates and Vonn Bell as the starting safeties to kick off the season. On September 26, 2021, Bates recorded a season-high nine combined tackles (six solo), before exiting in the fourth quarter after suffering a neck injury as the Bengals won 24–10 at the Pittsburgh Steelers. The following week, he was inactive for the first time of his career due to his neck injury after 53 consecutive starts as the Bengals defeated the Jacksonville Jaguars 24–21. In Week 5, Bates returned from his neck injury and collected a season-high eight solo tackles (nine combined) during a 22–25 loss against the Green Bay Packers. On October 31, 2021, Bates made eight combined tackles (six solo), a pass deflection, and had his first interception of the season off a pass by Mike White intended for Jamison Crowder and returned it for a career-long 65-yards before being tackles by wide receiver Elijah Moore during a 31–34 loss at the New York Jets. Bates was a healthy scratch for a Week 18 loss at the Cleveland Browns as head coach Zac Taylor elected to rest the majority of starters. He finished with 88 combined tackles (66 solo), four pass deflections, one fumble recovery, and one interception in 15 games and 15 starts.

The Cincinnati Bengals finished atop the AFC North and clinched a playoff berth with a 10–7 record. On January 16, 2022, Bates started in his first career playoff game, recording six combined tackles (two solo) and three pass deflections in the AFC Wildcard Game as the Bengals defeated the Las Vegas Raiders 26–19. The following week, he made four solo tackles, a pass deflection, and intercepted Ryan Tannehill's first pass of the game intended for wide receiver Julio Jones during a 19–16 victory at the Tennessee Titans in the Divisional Round. On January 30, 2022, Bates started in the AFC Championship Game and made four combined tackles (two solo) and one pass break up during a 27–24 victory at the Kansas City Chiefs. On February 13, 2022, Bates started in Super Bowl LVI against the Los Angeles Rams, recording six combined tackles (three solo), one pass break up, and intercepted a pass thrown by Matthew Stafford in the end zone while covering Van Jefferson during the second quarter of a disappointing 23–20 loss

==== 2022 season ====
On March 7, 2022, the Cincinnati Bengals placed the franchise tag on Bates. During the 2022 NFL draft, the Cincinnati Bengals drafted Bates heir apparent, Daxton Hill, 22nd overall. On August 23, 2022, the Cincinnati Bengals signed Bates to a one-year, $12.91 million franchise tag. Throughout training camp, Bates was projected to remain as the starting free safety, but had minor competition from 2022 first-round pick Daxton Hill. Head coach Zac Taylor opted to retain Bates and Vonn Bell as the starting safety duo.

On October 31, 2022, he racked up a season-high ten combined tackles (four solo) as the Bengals lost 13–32 at the Cleveland Browns. On December 11, 2022, Bates had a season-high two pass deflections, three solo tackles, and intercepted a pass by Deshaun Watson to Donovan Peoples-Jones of a 10–23 win against the Cleveland Browns. On January 2, 2023, Bates started in the Bengals 3–7 no contest against the Buffalo Bills after the game was suspended with 5:58 remaining in the first quarter after Bills' safety Damar Hamlin collapsed on the field due to cardiac arrest. The following week, Bates appeared in his last regular season game with the Bengals and made eight combined tackles (three solo), a pass deflection, had his only forced fumble of the season, and intercepted a pass by Anthony Brown to Isaiah Likely during a 27–16 win against the Baltimore Ravens in Week 18. He finished with a total of 71 combined tackles (38 solo), eight pass deflections, four interceptions, and a forced fumble while starting in all 16 games.

The Cincinnati Bengals finished atop the AFC North with a 12–4 record, clinching a playoff berth. On January 15, 2023, Bates led the Bengals with eight solo tackles (nine combined) during a 17–24 victory against the Baltimore Ravens in the AFC Wildcard Game. On January 29, 2023, Bates started in his last game as a member of the Cincinnati Bengals during a 23–20 loss at the Kansas City Chiefs in the AFC Championship and recorded six combined tackles (three solo).

=== Atlanta Falcons ===
==== 2023 season ====
On March 16, 2023, the Atlanta Falcons signed Bates to a four–year, $64.02 million contract that includes $36.00 million guaranteed upon signing and an initial signing bonus of $18.00 million. He entered training camp as the de facto starting free safety under defensive coordinator Ryan Nielsen, usurping Jaylinn Hawkins. Head coach Arthur Smith named Bates the starting free safety to begin the regular season, along with strong safety Richie Grant.

On September 10, 2023, Bates made his Atlanta Falcons debut and led the team with ten combined tackles (five solo), two pass deflections, forced a fumble, and tied his career-high with two interceptions off of passes thrown by Bryce Young during a 24–10 win against the Carolina Panthers in their home-opener. His performance earned him National Football Conference (NFC) Defensive Player of the Week. In Week 10, he collected a season-high 13 combined tackles (11 solo) during a 23–25 loss at the Arizona Cardinals. On November 26, 2023, Bates recorded 11 combined tackles (seven solo), a forced fumble, and returned an interception thrown by Derek Carr to wide receiver Rashid Shaheed for a career-best 92-yard touchdown in the Falcons' 24–15 win against the New Orleans Saints. His performance earned him NFC Defensive Player of the week, his second of the season. In Week 16, he made six combined tackles (four solo), two pass deflections, and set a career-high with his sixth interception of the season off a pass by Gardner Minshew during a 10–29 victory against the Indianapolis Colts.

He started all 17 games in 2023 and had career-highs with 132 combined tackles (89 solo), six interceptions, and three forced fumbles while also making 11 pass deflections and one touchdown. Bates earned a career-high overall grade of 90.6 from Pro Football Focus. He was also voted to the 2024 Pro Bowl for the first of his career and made second-team All-pro for the second time. On January 8, 2024, the Atlanta Falcons fired head coach Arthur Smith as a result of finishing 7–10. He was ranked 74th by his fellow players on the NFL Top 100 Players of 2024.

==== 2024 season ====
External videos
- Jessie Bates Hail Mary Interception
- Jessie Bates: 2024 Highlights

New defensive coordinator Jimmy Lake retained Bates as the starting free safety alongside strong safety Justin Simmons. On September 16, 2024, Bates recorded a season-high 12 combined tackles (seven solo), two pass breakups, and had a fourth quarter interception off a pass by Jalen Hurts to DeVonta Smith to seal a 22–21 win over the Philadelphia Eagles, earning NFC Defensive Player of the Week. In Week 16, he had two combined tackles (one solo), a season-high two pass deflections, and returned an interception by Drew Lock for a 55–yard touchdown as the Falcons routed the New York Giants 34–7. The following week, he collected a season-high tying 12 combined tackles (seven solo) and had his first career sack on Jayden Daniels during a 24–30 loss at the Washington Commanders. He started all 17 games in the 2024 NFL season and had a total of 102 combined tackles (72 solo), ten pass deflections, and four interceptions. He was ranked 92nd by his fellow players on the NFL Top 100 Players of 2025.

==== 2025 season ====
In Week 17 against the Los Angeles Rams, Bates intercepted a Matthew Stafford pass intended for Konata Mumpfield, and returned it 34 yards for a touchdown. He finished the 2025 season with 98 total tackles (57 solo), three interceptions, and six passes defended.

=== Jacksonville Jaguars ===
On November 9, 2026, Bates was traded to the Jacksonville Jaguars for a 2027 second-round pick and a 2028 fifth-round pick.

== NFL career statistics ==
Legend
	Led the league
**Bold**	Career high

=== Regular season ===
Year	Team	Games		Tackles					Interceptions						Fumbles			
Year	Team	GP	GS	Cmb	Solo	Ast	TfL	Sck	PD	Int	Yds	Avg	Lng	TD	FF	FR	Yds	TD
2018	CIN	16	16	111	73	38	0	0.0	7	3	42	14.0	21	**1**	0	0	0	0
2019	CIN	16	16	100	71	29	0	0.0	9	3	33	11.0	20	0	1	**1**	0	0
2020	CIN	16	16	109	78	31	2	0.0	**15**	3	12	4.0	12	0	1	0	0	0
2021	CIN	15	15	88	67	21	**3**	0.0	4	1	65	**65.0**	65	0	0	**1**	**46**	0
2022	CIN	16	16	71	38	33	1	0.0	8	4	28	7.0	16	0	1	0	0	0
2023	ATL	17	17	**132**	**89**	**43**	**3**	0.0	11	**6**	**95**	15.8	**92**	**1**	3	0	0	0
2024	ATL	17	17	102	62	40	2	**1.0**	10	4	55	13.8	55	**1**	**4**	**1**	0	0
2025	ATL	17	17	98	57	41	1	0.0	6	3	54	18.0	34	**1**	1	0	0	0
2026	ATL	9	9	60	35	25	0	0.0	4	1	0	0.0	0	0	3	**1**	36	**1**
Career		139	139	871	570	301	12	1.0	74	28	384	13.7	92	4	14	4	82	1

=== Postseason ===
Year	Team	Games		Tackles					Interceptions						Fumbles			
Year	Team	GP	GS	Cmb	Solo	Ast	TfL	Sck	PD	Int	Yds	Avg	Lng	TD	FF	FR	Yds	TD
2021	CIN	4	4	**20**	11	**9**	0	0.0	**6**	**2**	0	0.0	0	0	0	0	0	0
2022	CIN	3	3	**20**	**16**	4	**1**	0.0	0	0	0	0.0	0	0	0	0	0	0
Career		7	7	40	27	13	1	0.0	6	2	0	0.0	0	0	0	0	0	0
