= Fort Payne City Schools =

School district in Alabama

Fort Payne City School District is a school district in DeKalb County, Alabama.

== Notable alumni ==
- Sheila LaBarre
- Evan McPherson, professional football placekicker, Cincinnati Bengals
