= Vonn Bell =

American football player and coach (born 1994)

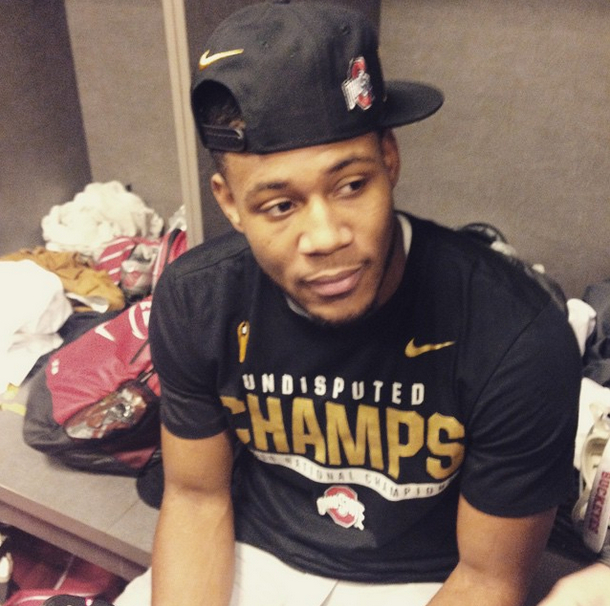
- Bell with the Ohio State Buckeyes in 2015

Colorado Buffaloes
- Title: Safeties coach

Personal information
- Born: December 12, 1994 (age 31); Chattanooga, Tennessee, U.S.
- Listed height: 5 ft 11 in (1.80 m)
- Listed weight: 210 lb (95 kg)

Career information
- Position: Safety
- High school: Ridgeland (Rossville, Georgia)
- College: Ohio State (2013–2015)
- NFL draft: 2016: 2nd round, 61st overall pick

Career history

Playing
- New Orleans Saints (2016–2019); Cincinnati Bengals (2020–2022); Carolina Panthers (2023); Cincinnati Bengals (2024)

Coaching
- Colorado (2026–present) Safeties coach

Awards and highlights
- CFP national champion (2015); First-team All-American (2015); First-team All-Big Ten (2015)

Career NFL statistics
- Total tackles: 760
- Sacks: 9.5
- Forced fumbles: 16
- Fumble recoveries: 12
- Pass deflections: 39
- Interceptions: 8
- Defensive touchdowns: 1
- Stats at Pro Football Reference

Vonn Christian Bell (born December 12, 1994) is an American former professional football safety, who currently serves as the safeties coach for the Colorado Buffaloes. He played college football for the Ohio State Buckeyes and was selected by the New Orleans Saints in the second round of the 2016 NFL draft. He also played for the Cincinnati Bengals and Carolina Panthers.

== Early life ==
Bell's first two years of high school were at Chattanooga Central High School in Harrison, Tennessee, where he received all district honors. Bell then attended Ridgeland High School in Rossville, Georgia. In Bell's senior year he led Ridgeland to the Georgia class AAAA state championship game but lost to Sandy Creek 41–10. He was rated by both Rivals.com and Scout.com as a five-star recruit and was ranked the number two safety in the country. Bell was rated as a five-star recruit by 247Sports and a high four-star by ESPN, who rated him as the 50th best player overall in the nation regardless of position. Bell was selected to play in the 2013 Under Armour All-American game. On February 6, 2013, he committed to Ohio State University.

== College career ==
Bell played in all 13 games as a backup his freshman season in 2013, but made his first career start on January 3, 2014, in the Discover Orange Bowl where he recorded his first collegiate interception. Bell became a full-time starter for the Buckeyes his sophomore season in 2014. He played in all 15 games recording 91 tackles and a conference-leading six interceptions. In the 2015 College Football Playoff National Championship victory over Oregon, he recorded six tackles and a sack.

== Professional career ==
=== Pre-draft ===
Bell attended the NFL Scouting Combine in Indianapolis, Indiana, but opted to skip the combine drills due to a hamstring injury. He chose to only meet with team representatives and had his measurements and weight taken. On March 11, 2016, he attended Ohio State's pro day and performed the 40-yard dash, 20-yard dash, 10-yard dash, and vertical jump for scouts and team representatives. He also attended private workouts and visits with multiple teams, including the Minnesota Vikings, Buffalo Bills, Atlanta Falcons, Los Angeles Rams, Tampa Bay Buccaneers, Jacksonville Jaguars, Pittsburgh Steelers, and Tennessee Titans among others. Bell was projected to be a second round pick by NFL draft experts and scouts. He was ranked the second best safety prospect in the draft by NFL analyst Mike Mayock and ESPN, the third best strong safety by DraftScout.com, and was ranked the 11th best defensive back by Sports Illustrated.

Pre-draft measurables
Height	Weight	Arm length	Hand span	Wingspan	40-yard dash	10-yard split	20-yard split	Vertical jump	Bench press
5 ft 10 3/4 in (1.80 m)	199 lb (90 kg)	32 3/8 in (0.82 m)	9 1/2 in (0.24 m)	6 ft 4 1/2 in (1.94 m)	4.51 s	1.60 s	2.62 s	30.5 in (0.77 m)	16 reps
All values from NFL Combine/Ohio State's Pro Day

=== New Orleans Saints ===
The New Orleans Saints selected Bell in the second round (61st overall) of the 2016 NFL draft. In order to secure their ability to draft Bell, the New Orleans Saints traded their 2016 third-round (78th overall) and fourth-round (112th overall) selections to the New England Patriots in exchange for the second round (61st overall) selection used to draft Bell. The New England Patriots went on to use the selections acquired to draft NC State's Joe Thuney (78th overall) and Georgia's Malcolm Mitchell (112th overall). He was the fourth safety selected in 2016.

External videos
- Saints select Vonn Bell 61st overall

==== 2016 ====
On May 10, 2016, the New Orleans Saints signed Bell to a four–year, $3.97 million contract that includes an initial signing bonus of $1.08 million.

Throughout training camp, Bell competed to be the starting free safety against veteran Jairus Byrd. He joined a group of established veteran safeties, including Jairus Byrd, Kenny Vaccaro, and Roman Harper. Head coach Sean Payton named Bell a backup safety to start the regular season, behind starters Jairus Byrd and Kenny Vaccaro.

External videos
- Saints' season review: Vonn Bell highlights

On September 9, 2016, Bell made his professional regular season debut in the New Orleans Saints' home-opening 35–34 loss against the Oakland Raiders. The following week, he earned his first career start as a nickelback and recorded a season-high nine combined tackles (seven solo) during a 16–13 road loss against the New York Giants in Week 2. Bell made his first NFL tackle on wide receiver Sterling Shepard after Shepard caught a five-yard pass on the Giants' first offensive snap. During Week 9, Bell recorded six combined tackles and was credited with half a sack during a 41–23 road victory over the San Francisco 49ers. He made his first sack with teammate Cameron Jordan, as they tackled Colin Kaepernick for a five-yard loss in the third quarter. In Week 15, Bell tied his season-high of nine combined tackles (seven solo) and forced a fumble in a 48–41 victory at the Arizona Cardinals. He finished his rookie season in 2016 with a total of 87 combined tackles (61 solo), four pass deflections, two forced fumbles, and a sack in 16 games and 14 starts. He was inconsistent throughout his rookie season and supplanted Byrd at free safety for a brief period at the beginning of the season before losing the role due to issues in pass coverage. He started two games at free safety and started 12 as either a nickel back in Dennis Allen's third-safety technique.

==== 2017 ====
During training camp, Bell competed against rookie second-round pick Marcus Williams for the job as the starting free safety after it was available following the departure of Jairus Byrd. Head coach Sean Payton named Marcus Williams and Kenny Vaccaro the starting safeties to begin the season, with Bell as a backup free safety.

During Week 6, Bell recorded five combined tackles (four solo) and made his first solo sack on Matthew Stafford during a 52–38 win against the Detroit Lions. In Week 11, he collected a season-high 13 combined tackles (ten solo) and a sack in a 34–31 victory over the Washington Redskins. The following week, Bell made 11 combined tackles (nine solo) and sacked Jared Goff once during a 26–20 loss at the Los Angeles Rams. He finished his sophomore season in 2017 with 83 combined tackles (62 solo), 4.5 sacks, and two pass deflections in 16 games and ten starts. Pro Football Focus (PFF) gave Bell an overall grade of 68.7, ranking him 65th among all qualifying safeties in 2017.

The New Orleans Saints finished the 2017 NFL season atop the NFC South with an 11–5 record. On January 7, 2018, Bell started in his first NFL playoff game and recorded nine combined tackles (seven solo) and sacked Cam Newton in a 31–26 victory against the Carolina Panthers in the NFC Wildcard Game. The following week, he made eight combined tackles (five solo) during a 29–24 loss at the Minnesota Vikings in the National Football Conference (NFC) Divisional Round.

==== 2018 ====
External videos
- Vonn Bell punches ball from Moore after big run

Throughout training camp, Bell competed against Kurt Coleman to be the starting strong safety following the departure of Kenny Vaccaro. Head coach Sean Payton named Bell the backup strong safety to begin the regular season. During Week 16, he collected a season-high ten combined tackles (seven solo) during a 31–28 victory against the Pittsburgh Steelers. He finished his third season with a career-high 89 combined tackles (63 solo), three pass deflections, one sack, and one forced fumble in 16 games and eight starts. Bell shared the starting strong safety role with Kurt Coleman in 2018 and was also the nickel back in packages the required five defensive backs. Bell received an overall grade of 74.3 from PFF in 2018, which ranked 24th among all qualified safeties.

==== 2019 ====
Defensive coordinator Dennis Allen chose Bell as the starting strong safety over rookie C. J. Gardner-Johnson to begin the season and paired him with Marcus Williams.

On September 22, 2019, Bell recorded nine combined tackles (five solo) and recovered a fumble that teammate Eli Apple caused from running back Chris Carson and returned it 33–yards and to score his first career touchdown as the Saints defeated the Seattle Seahawks 33–27. In the next game, Bell had ten combined tackles (seven solo), two fumble recoveries, and a forced a fumble off of running back Ezekiel Elliott in a narrow 12–10 victory against the Dallas Cowboys. During Week 7, Bell recorded a team high eight combined tackles (seven solo) and forced a fumble on wide receiver Anthony Miller and recovered it in the 36–25 victory at the Chicago Bears. On November 17, 2019, Bell made three combined tackles (two solo), was credited with half a sack, and made his first career interception off a pass thrown by Jameis Winston to wide receiver Chris Godwin during a 34–17 victory at the Tampa Bay Buccaneers. This marked his first career interception after 58 games. In Week 14, Bell recorded a team high 13 combined tackles (nine solo) and sacked Jimmy Garoppolo during a narrow 48–46 loss against the San Francisco 49ers. He injured his knee during the loss and subsequently missed the last three games (Weeks 15-17). He finished with 89 combined tackles (66 solo), five pass deflections, one interception, 1.5 sacks, a career-high five fumble recoveries, two forced fumbles, and one touchdown in 13 games and 13 starts.

=== Cincinnati Bengals (first stint) ===
==== 2020 ====
On March 26, 2020, the Cincinnati Bengals signed Bell to a three–year, $18 million contract that included an initial signing bonus of $3 million. Throughout training camp, Bell competed against Shawn Williams to be the starting strong safety. Head coach Zac Taylor named him the starter to begin the season, alongside free safety Jessie Bates.

In Week 10, he made three combined tackles (two solo) and a season-high two pass deflections as the Bengals lost 10–36 at the Pittsburgh Steelers. On November 29, 2020, Bell collected a season-high ten combined tackles (seven solo), forced a fumble, and had a fumble recovery during a 17–19 loss against the New York Giants. He finished the 2020 NFL season with a total of 100 combined tackles (59 solo), five pass deflections, three forced fumbles, and two fumble recoveries in 16 games and 16 starts.

==== 2021 ====
Defensive coordinator Lou Anarumo retained Bell and Jessie Bates as the starting safeties to begin the 2021 NFL season. On December 12, 2021, Bell made ten combined tackles (five solo) and forced a fumble during a 23–26 loss to the San Francisco 49ers. On December 26, 2021, Bell recorded five combined tackles (two solo), a season-high two pass deflections, and intercepted a pass thrown by Josh Johnson to wide receiver James Proche during a 41–21 victory against the Baltimore Ravens. He was inactive as a healthy scratch during a Week 18 loss to the Cleveland Browns as head coach Zac Taylor opted to rest his starters. He finished the 2021 NFL season with a total of 97 combined tackles (64 solo), eight pass deflections, three forced fumbles, one fumble recovery, one interception, and was credited with half a sack in 16 games and 16 starts.

The Cincinnati Bengals finished the 2021 NFL season first in the AFC North with a 10–7 record and clinched a playoff berth. On January 22, 2022, Bell made six combined tackles (five solo) and one sack as the Bengals won 19–16 at the Tennessee Titans in the AFC Divisional Round. On January 30, 2022, Bell started in the AFC Championship Game at the 2021 Kansas City Chiefs and made six combined tackles (three solo), one pass deflection, and intercepted a pass thrown by Patrick Mahomes to wide receiver Tyreek Hill in overtime as the Bengals won 27–24 and advanced to the Super Bowl LVI. On February 13, 2022, Bell started in Super Bowl LVI and made seven combined tackles (five solo) as the Cincinnati Bengals lost 20–23 against the Los Angeles Rams.

==== 2022 ====
Although the Cincinnati Bengals drafted Daxton Hill in the first round of the 2022 NFL draft, head coach Zac Taylor opted to remain with Bell and Jessie Bates as the starting safeties. In Week 3, he collected a season-high eight solo tackles during a 27–12 victory at the New York Jets. On September 29, 2022, Bell made four solo tackles, two pass deflections, and a career-high two interceptions off passes thrown by Tua Tagovailoa and Teddy Bridgewater in a 27–15 win against the Miami Dolphins. On October 31, 2022, he made four combined tackles (three solo), a pass deflection, was credited with half a sack, and set a career-high with his fourth interception on a pass thrown by wide receiver Amari Cooper to wide receiver Michael Woods II during a 13–32 loss at the Cleveland Browns. He started all 16 games in 2022 NFL season and made 77 combined tackles (53 solo), eight pass deflections, four interceptions, two forced fumbles, one fumble recovery, and one sack.

=== Carolina Panthers ===
==== 2023 ====
On March 15, 2023, the Carolina Panthers signed Bell to a three–year, $22.50 million contract that included $13.00 million guaranteed upon signing and an initial signing bonus of $5.83 million.

He entered training camp slated as the starting strong safety. Head coach Frank Reich named Bell and Xavier Woods the starting safeties to begin the season. On September 18, 2023, Bell made six combined tackles (three solo), a season-high two pass deflections, and intercepted a pass by Derek Carr to wide receiver Chris Olave during a 17–20 loss against the New Orleans Saints. In Week 5, he collected a season-high nine combined tackles (four solo) in the Panthers' 24–42 loss at the Detroit Lions. He suffered a quadriceps injury during the game and subsequently missed the next three games (Weeks 6–8). He was inactive during a Week 13 loss at the Tampa Bay Buccaneers after injuring his shoulder. He started 13 games in 2023 and recorded 69 combined tackles (42 solo), two pass deflections, and one interception.

==== 2024 ====
On March 13, 2024, the Carolina Panthers released Bell.

=== Cincinnati Bengals (second stint) ===
On March 15, 2024, the Cincinnati Bengals signed Bell to a one-year, $1.21 million contract. Head coach Zac Taylor named him the starting strong safety to begin the season, alongside free safety Geno Stone.

In Week 3, he collected a season-high nine combined tackles during a 33–38 loss to the Washington Commanders. Bell recorded six combined tackles, one pass deflection, and one interception in the Bengals' Week 4 win over his former team, the Carolina Panthers. Prior to Week 13, Bell was demoted and lost his starting role to Jordan Battle for the remainder of the season. He finished the season with a total of 55 combined tackles, two pass deflections, and one interception.

== Coaching career ==
On March 1, 2026, the Colorado Buffaloes hired Bell to serve as the team's safeties coach/defensive analyst under head coach Deion Sanders.

== NFL career statistics ==
Legend
**Bold**	Career high

=== Regular season ===
Year	Team	Games		Tackles				Fumbles				Interceptions					
Year	Team	GP	GS	Comb	Solo	Ast	Sack	FF	FR	Yds	TD	Int	Yds	Avg	Lng	TD	PD
2016	NO	16	14	87	61	26	1.0	2	1	0	0	0	0	0.0	0	0	4
2017	NO	16	10	83	62	21	**4.5**	2	0	0	0	0	0	0.0	0	0	2
2018	NO	16	8	89	63	26	1.0	1	1	0	0	0	0	0.0	0	0	3
2019	NO	13	13	89	66	23	1.5	2	**5**	38	**1**	1	19	19.0	19	0	5
2020	CIN	16	**16**	**114**	**67**	**47**	0.0	**3**	2	**65**	0	0	0	0.0	0	0	5
2021	CIN	16	**16**	97	64	33	0.5	**3**	1	0	0	1	15	15.0	15	0	**8**
2022	CIN	16	6	77	52	25	1.0	2	1	0	0	**4**	**56**	14.0	**46**	0	**8**
2023	CAR	13	13	69	42	27	0.0	0	0	0	0	1	11	11.0	11	0	2
2024	CIN	**17**	11	55	24	31	0.0	1	1	0	0	1	32	**32.0**	32	0	2
Career		139	107	760	501	259	9.5	16	12	103	1	8	133	18.2	46	0	39

=== Postseason ===
Year	Team	Games		Tackles				Fumbles				Interceptions					
Year	Team	GP	GS	Comb	Solo	Ast	Sack	FF	FR	Yds	TD	Int	Yds	Avg	Lng	TD	PD
2017	NO	2	2	**17**	**12**	**5**	**1.0**	0	0	0	0	0	0	0.0	0	0	0
2018	NO	2	2	8	6	2	0.0	0	0	0	0	0	0	0.0	0	0	**1**
2019	NO	1	1	7	4	3	0.0	0	**1**	**6**	0	0	0	0.0	0	0	0
2021	CIN	**3**	**3**	16	**12**	4	**1.0**	0	0	0	0	**1**	**5**	**5.0**	**5**	0	**1**
Career		8	8	48	34	14	2.0	0	1	6	0	1	5	5.0	5	0	2

== Personal life ==
Bell's older brother Volonte Bell was an assistant coach at Chattanooga State Community College. Volonte Bell was killed in a car accident on February 24, 2020.
