= Sheila LaBarre =

American murderer (born 1958)

- Born: Sheila Kay Bailey; July 4, 1958 (age 68); Fort Payne, Alabama, US
- Conviction: First degree murder (2 counts)
- Penalty: Life imprisonment without the possibility of parole

Details
- Victims: 2–4
- Span of crimes: 2004–2006
- Country: United States
- State: New Hampshire
- Date apprehended: April 2, 2006

Sheila LaBarre (born Sheila Kay Bailey on July 4, 1958) is an American murderer and possible serial killer. She was sentenced to two consecutive life sentences, with no prospect of parole after being convicted of killing two men, Kenneth Countie and Michael Deloge, in Epping, New Hampshire. At the time of the crimes, LaBarre lived in Epping (Rockingham County) on a farm.

She regularly enticed younger men to her farm, where she would torture and control them.

At her trial she claimed she was an angel, sent by God to punish pedophiles. She accused the two men she killed of being pedophiles.

== Biography ==
LaBarre was born Sheila Kaye Bailey in Alabama in 1958. She has a sister, Lynn Noojin. She had a difficult, abusive upbringing, as she, her sister and mother were sexually, physically, and verbally abused by her alcoholic father, and he would bring other men over to partake in sexually assaulting Sheila. She graduated from Fort Payne High School in 1976.

After marrying Ronnie Jennings, she was known as Sheila Bailey Jennings. She wanted to divorce Ronnie, but he refused to divorce her for some time. In the early 1980s, LaBarre was held in a psychiatric facility after attempting suicide. Noojin testified that her sister had told her while in the mental hospital, an orderly tried to rape her .

She married John Baxter in January 1981.

LaBarre moved from Fort Payne to Epping, New Hampshire, in 1987 after answering a personal ad placed by Wilfred "Bill" LaBarre, a chiropractor. She never legally married Bill LaBarre, but took his last name ("Sheila LaBarre"), and they lived together from 1987 until his death at age 74 in 2000. Bill LaBarre had been married twice before. However, Sheila LaBarre married a Jamaican citizen named Wayne Ennis in York, Maine, on August 22, 1995. She then divorced Ennis in 1996. In April 1997, Sheila LaBarre got a restraining order against Ennis after he had allegedly repeatedly assaulted her.

After Bill's death, Sheila LaBarre inherited his farm. She said she was his common-law wife. His children from a previous relationship attempted to contest the will to get money and property, but were informed they had a 50/50 chance of success and would have to pay $50,000 upfront. After LaBarre's arrest there was speculation that she may have killed Bill, an allegation which LaBarre has denied.

== Crimes ==
=== Kenny Countie ===
Kenny Countie met her via a personal ad in 2006 at Wilmington, Massachusetts, when he was 24. He moved in with her shortly after meeting her. Countie was described as having a low IQ and "child like" trust. LaBarre made a recording of him vomiting whilst she accused him of being a pedophile. She stabbed him to death and then burnt his body. The police were able to identify his DNA from his army records.

Countie's mother subsequently accused the Epping Police Department of negligence. Prior to his death, he had been seen in a Walmart store, bruised and burned, in a wheelchair. Her lawsuit against the two police officers who had seen him in the store was rejected in 2010.

=== Michael Deloge ===
Deloge was LaBarre's boyfriend, who lived with her at her farm. He was last seen alive in 2005. A bone, a spent shell casing and his birth certificate were found in the septic tank of the farm in 2008. It is unknown how he died. His mother informed the police that she was worried LaBarre was trying to kill him.

=== Arrest ===
An arrest warrant was issued on April 1, 2006, for Sheila LaBarre, for charges of first degree murder. She was arrested on April 2, and the police conducted a three-week search of her farm, which led to the discovery of three human toes which forensic analysis determined did not belong to either Kenny Countie or Michael Deloge.

=== Trial ===
The jury visited LaBarre's farm and the Walmart where she was seen with Countie. LaBarre attended too, wearing a stun belt. LaBarre pleaded not guilty to murdering Countie and Deloge on the grounds of insanity. Her defense attorney described her as a "deeply, deeply sick individual". At trial in May 2008, psychiatrists testified that LaBarre was diagnosed with schizoaffective disorder and delusional disorder. James Brackett testified in court that he was in an abusive relationship with LaBarre for six years.

LaBarre's ex-husband Wayne Ennis claimed that she had asked him to kill Wilfred. Wilfred LaBarre's daughter Laura Melisi claimed that LaBarre had threatened to shoot people. She stated she always disliked Sheila LaBarre, and had warned her father against pursuing a relationship. Her plea of not guilty by reason of insanity was rejected by the jury. They found her guilty and LaBarre was sentenced to life in prison without parole in June 2008.

Her appeal in 2010 was rejected. LaBarre is currently serving her sentence at New Hampshire State Prison for Women.

=== Media portrayal ===
Her case is featured on the Season 5, Episode 3, titled "Crazy in Love", from the show Deadly Sins and the show Signs of a Psychopath, Season 7, Episode 6, titled "He Had It Coming", broadcast on Investigation Discovery and Season 1, Episode 7, of First Blood (2022) titled "Sheila LaBarre: Sheila The Peeler" on A&E. [Oxygen] The show Snapped, Season 31, Episode 13, (10/9/2022) [Oxygen True Crime]

== See also ==
- List of serial killers in the United States
