= 2021 Cincinnati Bengals season =

54th season in franchise history; 3rd Super Bowl appearance

- Owner: Mike Brown
- Head coach: Zac Taylor
- Offensive coordinator: Brian Callahan
- Defensive coordinator: Lou Anarumo
- Home stadium: Paul Brown Stadium

Results
- Record: 10–7
- Division place: 1st AFC North
- Playoffs: Won Wild Card Playoffs (vs. Raiders) 26–19; Won Divisional Playoffs (at Titans) 19–16; Won AFC Championship (at Chiefs) 27–24 (OT); Lost Super Bowl LVI (vs. (Note: Despite being played in the Rams' home stadium, the Super Bowl is still officially considered a neutral site game. The Bengals were the designated home team based on annual conference rotation.) Rams) 20–23
- All-Pros: WR Ja'Marr Chase (2nd team)
- Pro Bowlers: Selected but did not play due to participation in Super Bowl LVI: WR Ja'Marr Chase; RB Joe Mixon; DE Trey Hendrickson

Uniform
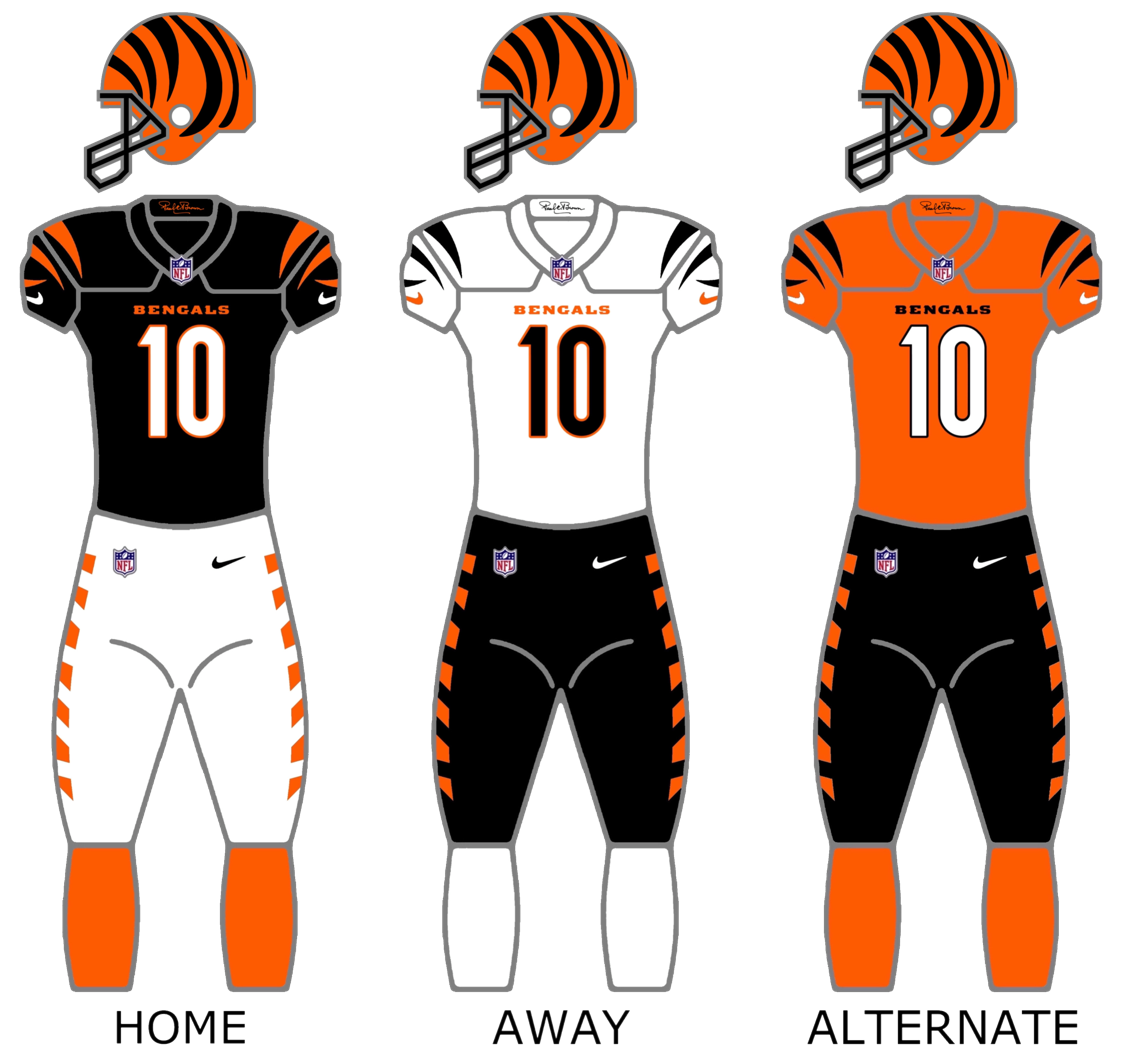

The 2021 season was the Cincinnati Bengals' 52nd season in the National Football League (NFL), their 54th overall and their third under head coach Zac Taylor. They also played in new uniforms for the first time since 2004. The Bengals finished with a 10–7 record, exceeding their win total from the previous two seasons combined. The Bengals clinched their first winning season, first playoff appearance, and first AFC North title since 2015. It also marked their first Super Bowl appearance since 1988.

The Bengals began their playoff run by defeating the Las Vegas Raiders 26–19 in the wild-card round, winning their first playoff game since 1990, and ending what was the NFL's longest playoff win drought. They beat the top-seeded Tennessee Titans 19–16 in the divisional round, which not only marked their first-ever playoff win on the road but also allowed them to advance to the AFC Championship game for the first time since 1988. They defeated the second-seeded Kansas City Chiefs 27–24 in overtime. As a result, they advanced to Super Bowl LVI, their third Super Bowl in franchise history and first in 33 years. Quarterback Joe Burrow became the first second-year quarterback since Russell Wilson in 2013 to reach a Super Bowl, and the first No. 1-picked QB to do so within their first two seasons. However, the Bengals lost to the Los Angeles Rams in the Super Bowl 23–20.

For the first time since 2010, A. J. Green was not on the opening day roster.

== Offseason ==
=== Free agents ===
As of March 15, 2021

==== Unrestricted ====
Position	Player	2021 Team	Date signed	Contract
CB	Mackensie Alexander	Minnesota Vikings	March 26	1 year, $1.127 million
QB	Brandon Allen	Cincinnati Bengals	March 10	1 year, $1.5 million
K	Randy Bullock	Detroit Lions	March 18	1 year, $1.5 million
MLB	Josh Bynes	Carolina Panthers	August 11	1 year, $850k
TE	Cethan Carter	Miami Dolphins	March 15	3 years, $7.8 million
DT	Christian Covington	Los Angeles Chargers	May 10	1 year, $990k
DT	Mike Daniels	Cincinnati Bengals	March 31	1 year, $2.5 million
WR	Alex Erickson	Houston Texans	March 18	1 year, $1.2 million
OLB	Jordan Evans	Cincinnati Bengals	March 28	1 year, $1.127 million
WR	A. J. Green	Arizona Cardinals	March 17	1 year, $8 million
LS	Clark Harris	Cincinnati Bengals	March 3	1 year, $1.2 million
P	Kevin Huber	Cincinnati Bengals	March 22	1 year, $1.637 million
DE	Margus Hunt	Arizona Cardinals	August 11	1 year, $1.075 million
CB	William Jackson III	Washington Football Team	March 16	3 years, $42 million
DE	Carl Lawson	New York Jets	March 15	3 years, $45 million
RB	Samaje Perine	Cincinnati Bengals	March 17	2 years, $3.3 million
G	Alex Redmond	New England Patriots	May 17	1 year, $1.080 million
WR	John Ross	New York Giants	March 16	1 year, $2.5 million
CB	LeShaun Sims			
G	Quinton Spain	Cincinnati Bengals	March 23	1 year, $1.127 million
WR	Mike Thomas	Cincinnati Bengals	March 18	1 year, $1.015 million
S	Shawn Williams	Arizona Cardinals	March 29	1 year, $1.075 million
DT	Xavier Williams	Arizona Cardinals	June 7	1 year, $990k
FS	Brandon Wilson	Cincinnati Bengals	March 16	2 years, $4.625 million

==== Restricted ====
Position	Player	2021 Team	Date signed	Contract
CB	Tony Brown	Cincinnati Bengals	March 17	1 year, $920k

==== Exclusive rights ====
Position	Player	2021 Team	Date signed	Contract
DE	Amani Bledsoe	Cincinnati Bengals	March 31	1 year, $780k
CB	Jalen Davis	Cincinnati Bengals	March 3	1 year, $850k

=== Signings ===
Position	Player	2020 team	Date signed	Contract
DE	Trey Hendrickson	New Orleans Saints	March 15	4 years, $60 million
CB	Chidobe Awuzie	Dallas Cowboys	March 16	3 years, $21.75 million
CB	Mike Hilton	Pittsburgh Steelers	March 16	4 years, $24 million
DT	Larry Ogunjobi	Cleveland Browns	March 17	1 year, $6.2 million
OT	Riley Reiff	Minnesota Vikings	March 19	1 year, $7.5 million
CB	Eli Apple	Carolina Panthers	March 23	1 year, $1.2 million
S	Ricardo Allen	Atlanta Falcons	March 24	1 year, $1.49 million
TE	Thaddeus Moss	Washington Football Team	April 12	1 year, $660k
WR	Trent Taylor	San Francisco 49ers	May 17	1 year, $920k
S	Kavon Frazier	Miami Dolphins	May 27	1 year, $990k
WR	Reece Horn	Tampa Bay Vipers (XFL)	July 26	1 year, $660k

=== Releases ===
Position	Player	Date released	2021 team	Contract
C	B. J. Finney	March 5	Pittsburgh Steelers	1 year, $1.127 million
DT	Geno Atkins	March 19		
OT	Bobby Hart	March 19	Buffalo Bills	1 year, $1.127 million
RB	Giovani Bernard	April 7	Tampa Bay Buccaneers	1 year, $1.075 million

=== Trades ===
- March 19 – Quarterback Ryan Finley and the Bengals' 2021 seventh-round selection (No. 231 overall) were traded to the Houston Texans for the Texans' 2021 sixth-round selection (No. 200 overall).
- August 30 – Center Billy Price was traded to the New York Giants for defensive tackle B.J. Hill.

=== Draft ===
2021 Cincinnati Bengals draft
Round	Pick	Player	Position	College	Notes
1	5	Ja'Marr Chase *	WR	LSU	First season starter
2	46	Jackson Carman	OT	Clemson	from New England
3	69	Joseph Ossai	DE	Texas	
4	111	Cameron Sample	DE	Tulane	
4	122	Tyler Shelvin	DT	LSU	from Arizona via Houston and New England
4	139	D'Ante Smith	OT	East Carolina	from New England
5	149	Evan McPherson	K	Florida	First season starter
6	190	Trey Hill	C	Georgia	
6	202	Chris Evans	RB	Michigan	from Miami via Houston
7	235	Wyatt Hubert	DE	Kansas State	from Detroit via Seattle
Made roster † Pro Football Hall of Fame * Made at least one Pro Bowl during career

Trades

- Seattle traded center B. J. Finney and Detroit's seventh-round selection (No. 235) to Cincinnati for defensive end Carlos Dunlap.
- Cincinnati traded Ryan Finley and seventh round selection (No. 248) to the Houston Texans in exchange for a sixth-round selection (No. 202).
- Cincinnati traded their second-round selection (38th overall) to the New England Patriots in exchange for the Patriots second-round selection (46th overall) and two fourth-round selections (122nd and 139th overall).

=== Undrafted free agents ===
The Bengals announced their Undrafted free agent class on May 14.

2021 Undrafted Free Agents
Player	Position	College	Date	Cut
Pooka Williams Jr.	RB	Kansas	May 14	August 31
Pro Wells	TE	TCU	May 14	August 16
Antonio Phillips	CB	Ball State	May 14	August 31
Darius Hodge	DE	Marshall	May 14	
Riley Lees	WR	Northwestern	May 14	August 16
Drue Chrisman	P	Ohio State	May 14	August 31
Gunnar Vogel	OT	Northwestern	July 27	August 31

== Staff ==
2021 Cincinnati Bengals staff
Front office: Owner/president – Mike Brown; Executive vice president – Katie Blackburn; Vice president – Troy Blackburn; Vice president of player personnel – Paul H. Brown; Director of player personnel – Duke Tobin; Personnel executive – Bill Tobin; College scouting director – Mike Potts; Pro scouting director – Steven Radicevic; Head coaches: Head coach – Zac Taylor; Assistant head coach/special teams coordinator – Darrin Simmons; Offensive coaches: Offensive coordinator – Brian Callahan; Quarterbacks – Dan Pitcher; Running backs – Justin Hill; Wide receivers – Troy Walters; Assistant wide receivers – Brad Kragthorpe; Tight ends – James Casey; Offensive line/run game coordinator – Frank Pollack; Assistant offensive line – Ben Martin	Defensive coaches: Defensive coordinator – Lou Anarumo; Defensive line – Marion Hobby; Linebackers – Al Golden; Secondary/safeties – Robert Livingston; Cornerbacks – Steve Jackson; Senior defensive assistant – Mark Duffner; Defensive quality control – Jordan Kovacs; Defensive quality control – Louie Cioffi; Special teams coaches: Assistant special teams – Colt Anderson; Strength and conditioning: Strength and conditioning – Joey Boese; Assistant strength and conditioning – Todd Hunt; Assistant strength and conditioning – Garrett Swanson

== Final roster ==
2021 Cincinnati Bengals roster
Quarterbacks (QB): 8 Brandon Allen; 9 Joe Burrow; Running backs (RB): 25 Chris Evans; 28 Joe Mixon; 34 Samaje Perine; 32 Trayveon Williams; Wide receivers (WR): 83 Tyler Boyd; 1 Ja'Marr Chase; 85 Tee Higgins; 16 Trenton Irwin; 17 Stanley Morgan Jr.; 80 Mike Thomas; Tight ends (TE): 89 Drew Sample; 87 C. J. Uzomah; 84 Mitchell Wilcox	Offensive linemen (OL): 77 Hakeem Adeniji G; 79 Jackson Carman G; 63 Trey Hill C/G; 66 Trey Hopkins C; 74 Fred Johnson T; 75 Isaiah Prince T; 70 D'Ante Smith T; 67 Quinton Spain G; 73 Jonah Williams T; Defensive linemen (DL): 91 Trey Hendrickson DE; 92 B. J. Hill DT; 94 Sam Hubbard DE; 90 Khalid Kareem DE; 69 Zach Kerr DT; 93 Wyatt Ray DE; 98 D. J. Reader DT; 96 Cameron Sample DE; 99 Tyler Shelvin DT; 68 Josh Tupou DT	Linebackers (LB): 51 Markus Bailey MLB; 44 Clay Johnston MLB; 47 Keandre Jones OLB; 57 Germaine Pratt OLB; 55 Logan Wilson MLB; Defensive backs (DB): 37 Ricardo Allen SS; 20 Eli Apple CB; 22 Chidobe Awuzie CB; 30 Jessie Bates FS; 24 Vonn Bell SS; 35 Jalen Davis CB; 33 Tre Flowers CB; 29 Vernon Hargreaves CB; 21 Mike Hilton CB; 31 Michael Thomas FS; 26 Trae Waynes CB; Special teams (ST): 46 Clark Harris LS; 10 Kevin Huber P; 2 Evan McPherson K	Practice squad: 39 John Brannon CB; 6 Jake Browning QB; 48 Austin Calitro OLB; 76 Mike Daniels DT; 61 Lamont Gaillard C; 41 Trayvon Henderson SS; 36 Elijah Holyfield RB; 81 Thaddeus Moss TE (PS/I); 43 Chris Myarick TE; 86 Mason Schreck TE (PS/I); 52 Noah Spence DE; 62 Damion Square DT; 72 Xavier Suʻa-Filo G; 64 Keaton Sutherland G; 11 Trent Taylor WR; 82 Scotty Washington TE; 12 Pooka Williams RB; 95 Renell Wren DT; Reserve: 49 Joe Bachie OLB (IR); 59 Akeem Davis-Gaither OLB (IR); 50 Jordan Evans OLB (IR); 56 Wyatt Hubert DE (NF-Inj.); 65 Larry Ogunjobi DT (IR); 58 Joseph Ossai DE (IR); 23 Darius Phillips CB (IR); 71 Riley Reiff T (IR); 19 Auden Tate WR (IR); 40 Brandon Wilson FS (IR); Rookies in italics 53 active, 10 reserve, 16 practice squad (2 exempt)

== NFL Top 100 ==
Rank	Player	Position	Change
73	Trey Hendrickson	DE	N/A
90	Jessie Bates	FS	N/A

== Preseason ==
The Bengals' preseason opponents and schedule were announced on May 12.

Week	Date	Opponent	Result	Record	Venue	Recap
1	August 14	at Tampa Bay Buccaneers	W 19–14	1–0	Raymond James Stadium	Recap
2	August 20	at Washington Football Team	L 13–17	1–1	FedExField	Recap
3	August 29	Miami Dolphins	L 26–29	1–2	Paul Brown Stadium	Recap

== Regular season ==
=== Schedule ===
The Bengals 2021 schedule was announced on May 12.

Week	Date	Opponent	Result	Record	Venue	Recap
1	September 12	Minnesota Vikings	**W** 27–24 (OT)	1–0	Paul Brown Stadium	Recap
2	September 19	at Chicago Bears	**L** 17–20	1–1	Soldier Field	Recap
3	September 26	at **Pittsburgh Steelers**	**W** 24–10	2–1	Heinz Field	Recap
4	September 30	Jacksonville Jaguars	**W** 24–21	3–1	Paul Brown Stadium	Recap
5	October 10	Green Bay Packers	**L** 22–25 (OT)	3–2	Paul Brown Stadium	Recap
6	October 17	at Detroit Lions	**W** 34–11	4–2	Ford Field	Recap
7	October 24	at **Baltimore Ravens**	**W** 41–17	5–2	M&T Bank Stadium	Recap
8	October 31	at New York Jets	**L** 31–34	5–3	MetLife Stadium	Recap
9	November 7	**Cleveland Browns**	**L** 16–41	5–4	Paul Brown Stadium	Recap
10	Bye					
11	November 21	at Las Vegas Raiders	**W** 32–13	6–4	Allegiant Stadium	Recap
12	November 28	**Pittsburgh Steelers**	**W** 41–10	7–4	Paul Brown Stadium	Recap
13	December 5	Los Angeles Chargers	**L** 22–41	7–5	Paul Brown Stadium	Recap
14	December 12	San Francisco 49ers	**L** 23–26 (OT)	7–6	Paul Brown Stadium	Recap
15	December 19	at Denver Broncos	**W** 15–10	8–6	Empower Field at Mile High	Recap
16	December 26	**Baltimore Ravens**	**W** 41–21	9–6	Paul Brown Stadium	Recap
17	January 2	Kansas City Chiefs	**W** 34–31	10–6	Paul Brown Stadium	Recap
18	January 9	at **Cleveland Browns**	**L** 16–21	10–7	FirstEnergy Stadium	Recap

Note: Intra-division opponents are in bold text.

=== Game summaries ===
==== Week 1: vs. Minnesota Vikings ====
Week 1: Minnesota Vikings at Cincinnati Bengals – Game summary

Quarter	1	2	3	4	OT	Total
Vikings	0	7	7	10	0	**24**
**Bengals**	0	14	7	3	3	**27**

at Paul Brown Stadium, Cincinnati, Ohio

- Date: September 12
- Game time: 1:00 p.m. EDT
- Game weather: Mostly sunny, 84 °F (29 °C)
- Game attendance: 56,525
- Referee: Adrian Hill
- TV announcers (Fox): Chris Myers, Daryl Johnston and Jen Hale
- Recap, Game Book

Game information

**First quarter**

- No scoring plays

**Second quarter**

- MIN – Adam Thielen 5-yard pass from Kirk Cousins (Greg Joseph kick), 6:39. Vikings 7–0. **Drive: 14 plays, 91 yards, 8:21.**
- CIN – Tee Higgins 2-yard pass from Joe Burrow (Evan McPherson kick), 1:47. Tied 7–7. **Drive: 9 plays, 75 yards, 4:52.**
- CIN – Ja'Marr Chase 50-yard pass from Joe Burrow (Evan McPherson kick), 0:35. Bengals 14–7. **Drive: 4 plays, 75 yards, 0:36.**

**Third quarter**

- CIN – Joe Mixon 2-yard run (Evan McPherson kick), 9:15. Bengals 21–7. **Drive: 11 plays, 75 yards, 5:45.**
- MIN – Adam Thielen 24-yard pass from Kirk Cousins (Greg Joseph kick), 2:24 Bengals 21–14. **Drive: 4 plays, 30 yards, 0:51.**

**Fourth quarter**

- CIN – Evan McPherson 53-yard field goal, 14:13. Bengals 24–14. **Drive: 7 plays, 40 yards, 3:11.**
- MIN – Dalvin Cook 1-yard run (Greg Joseph kick), 9:23. Bengals 24–21. **Drive: 10 plays, 75 yards, 4:50.**
- MIN – Greg Joseph 53-yard field goal, 0:00. Tied 24–24. **Drive: 9 plays, 60 yards, 1:48.**

**Overtime**

- CIN – Evan McPherson 33-yard field goal, 0:00. Bengals 27–24. **Drive: 7 plays, 46 yards, 1:48.**

**Top passers**

- MIN – Kirk Cousins – 36/49, 351 yards, 2 TD
- CIN – Joe Burrow – 20/27, 261 yards, 2 TD

**Top rushers**

- MIN – Dalvin Cook – 20 rushes, 61 yards, TD
- CIN – Joe Mixon – 29 rushes, 127 yards, TD

**Top receivers**

- MIN – Adam Thielen – 9 receptions, 92 yards, 2 TD
- CIN – Ja'Marr Chase – 5 receptions, 101 yards, TD

==== Week 2: at Chicago Bears ====
Week 2: Cincinnati Bengals at Chicago Bears – Game summary

Quarter	1	2	3	4	Total
Bengals	0	0	3	14	**17**
**Bears**	7	0	0	13	**20**

at Soldier Field, Chicago, Illinois

- Date: September 19
- Game time: 1:00 p.m. EDT/12:00 p.m. CDT
- Game weather: Sunny, 81 °F (27 °C)
- Game attendance: 60,840
- Referee: Land Clark
- TV announcers (Fox): Kevin Kugler, Mark Sanchez and Laura Okmin
- Recap, Game Book

Game information

**First quarter**

- CHI – Allen Robinson 11-yard pass from Andy Dalton (Cairo Santos kick), 9:58. Bears 7–0. **Drive: 9 plays, 75 yards, 5:02.**

**Second quarter**

- No scoring plays.

**Third quarter**

- CIN – Evan McPherson 53-yard field goal, 8:22. Bears 7–3. **Drive: 11 plays, 43 yards, 6:38.**

**Fourth quarter**

- CHI – Cairo Santos 28-yard field goal, 14:52. Bears 10–3. **Drive: 8 plays, 29 yards, 4:56.**
- CHI – Roquan Smith 53-yard interception return (Cairo Santos kick), 10:55. Bears 17–3.
- CHI – Cairo Santos 22-yard field goal, 6:40. Bears 20–3. **Drive: 4 plays, 5 yards, 1:26.**
- CIN – Ja'Marr Chase 42-yard pass from Joe Burrow (Evan McPherson kick), 4:39. Bears 20–10. **Drive: 6 plays, 75 yards, 2:01.**
- CIN – Tee Higgins 7-yard pass from Joe Burrow (Evan McPherson kick), 3:39. Bears 20–17. **Drive: 1 play, 7 yards, 0:04.**

**Top passers**

- CIN – Joe Burrow – 19/30, 207 yards, 2 TD, 3 INT
- CHI – Justin Fields – 6/13, 60 yards, INT

**Top rushers**

- CIN – Joe Mixon – 20 rushes, 69 yards
- CHI – David Montgomery – 20 rushes, 61 yards

**Top receivers**

- CIN – Tyler Boyd – 7 receptions, 73 yards
- CHI – Darnell Mooney – 6 receptions, 66 yards

==== Week 3: at Pittsburgh Steelers ====
Week 3: Cincinnati Bengals at Pittsburgh Steelers – Game summary

Quarter	1	2	3	4	Total
**Bengals**	7	7	10	0	**24**
Steelers	0	7	0	3	**10**

at Heinz Field, Pittsburgh, Pennsylvania

- Date: September 26
- Game time: 1:00 p.m. EDT
- Game weather: Sunny, 70 °F (21 °C)
- Game attendance: 58,076
- Referee: Clete Blakeman
- TV announcers (CBS): Kevin Harlan, Trent Green and Melanie Collins
- Recap, Game Book

Game information

**First quarter**

- CIN – Tyler Boyd 17-yard pass from Joe Burrow (Evan McPherson kick), 2:54. Bengals 7–0. **Drive: 6 plays, 42 yards, 3:51.**

**Second quarter**

- PIT – Pat Freiermuth 4-yard pass from Ben Roethlisberger (Chris Boswell kick), 1:04. Tied 7–7. **Drive: 15 plays, 86 yards, 8:32.**
- CIN – Ja'Marr Chase 34-yard pass from Joe Burrow (Evan McPherson kick), 0:37. Bengals 14–7. **Drive: 3 plays, 75 yards, 0:27.**

**Third quarter**

- CIN – Evan McPherson 43-yard field goal, 8:47. Bengals 17–7. **Drive: 10 plays, 55 yards, 6:13.**
- CIN – Ja'Marr Chase 9-yard pass from Joe Burrow (Evan McPherson kick), 6:18. Bengals 24–7. **Drive: 3 plays, 19 yards, 1:33.**

**Fourth quarter**

- PIT – Chris Boswell 26-yard field goal, 8:09. Bengals 24–10. **Drive: 18 plays, 88 yards, 9:03.**

**Top passers**

- CIN – Joe Burrow – 14/18, 172 yards, 3 TD, INT
- PIT – Ben Roethlisberger – 38/58, 318 yards, TD, 2 INT

**Top rushers**

- CIN – Joe Mixon – 18 rushes, 90 yards
- PIT – Najee Harris – 14 rushes, 40 yards

**Top receivers**

- CIN – Ja'Marr Chase – 4 receptions, 65 yards, 2 TD
- PIT – Najee Harris – 14 receptions, 102 yards

This was Cincinnati's first win in Pittsburgh since 2015.

==== Week 4: vs. Jacksonville Jaguars ====
Week 4: Jacksonville Jaguars at Cincinnati Bengals – Game summary

Quarter	1	2	3	4	Total
Jaguars	7	7	0	7	**21**
**Bengals**	0	0	14	10	**24**

at Paul Brown Stadium, Cincinnati, Ohio

- Date: September 30
- Game time: 8:20 p.m. EDT
- Game weather: Clear, 70 °F (21 °C)
- Game attendance: 63,198
- Referee: Brad Allen
- TV announcers (NFLN/Prime Video): Joe Buck, Troy Aikman, Erin Andrews and Kristina Pink
- Recap, Game Book

Game information

**First quarter**

- JAX – James Robinson 6-yard run (Matthew Wright kick), 1:28. Jaguars 7–0. **Drive: 8 plays, 67 yards, 3:53.**

**Second quarter**

- JAX – Trevor Lawrence 7-yard run (Matthew Wright kick), 4:45. Jaguars 14–0. **Drive: 12 plays, 80 yards, 7:10.**

**Third quarter**

- CIN – C. J. Uzomah 22-yard pass from Joe Burrow (Evan McPherson kick), 13:12. Jaguars 14–7. **Drive: 4 plays, 69 yards, 1:48.**
- CIN – Joe Mixon 1-yard run (Evan McPherson kick), 5:10. Tied 14–14. **Drive: 12 plays, 86 yards, 6:29.**

**Fourth quarter**

- JAX – James Robinson 4-yard run (Matthew Wright kick), 14:27. Jaguars 21–14. **Drive: 11 plays, 77 yards, 5:43.**
- CIN – C. J. Uzomah 33-yard pass from Joe Burrow (Evan McPherson kick), 8:59. Tied 21–21. **Drive: 10 plays, 75 yards, 5:28.**
- CIN – Evan McPherson 35-yard field goal, 0:00. Bengals 24–21. **Drive: 10 plays, 73 yards, 5:33.**

**Top passers**

- JAX – Trevor Lawrence – 17/24, 204 yards
- CIN – Joe Burrow – 25/32, 348 yards, 2 TD

**Top rushers**

- JAX – James Robinson – 18 rushes, 78 yards, 2 TD
- CIN – Joe Mixon – 16 rushes, 67 yards, TD

**Top receivers**

- JAX – Laviska Shenault – 6 receptions, 99 yards
- CIN – Tyler Boyd – 9 receptions, 118 yards

The Bengals improved to 3–1 for the first time since 2018 with this win, despite only taking the lead with 4 seconds left in the game on a game winning Evan McPherson field goal. Burrow was recognized as the AFC Offensive Player of the Week for his performance in this game, in which he completed 25 out of 32 passes for a total of 348 yards and two touchdowns with no interceptions, posting a 132.8 passer rating.

==== Week 5: vs. Green Bay Packers ====
Week 5: Green Bay Packers at Cincinnati Bengals – Game summary

Quarter	1	2	3	4	OT	Total
**Packers**	0	16	3	3	3	**25**
Bengals	7	7	0	8	0	**22**

at Paul Brown Stadium, Cincinnati, Ohio

- Date: October 10
- Game time: 1:00 p.m. EDT
- Game weather: Partly sunny, 80 °F (27 °C)
- Game attendance: 64,195
- Referee: Bill Vinovich
- TV announcers (Fox): Kenny Albert, Jonathan Vilma and Lindsay Czarniak
- Recap, Game Book

Game information

**First quarter**

- CIN – Samaje Perine 4-yard pass from Joe Burrow (Evan McPherson kick), 1:15. Bengals 7–0. **Drive: 10 plays, 51 yards, 4:58.**

**Second quarter**

- GB – A. J. Dillon 12-yard pass from Aaron Rodgers (kick failed), 11:49. Bengals 7–6. **Drive: 7 plays, 75 yards, 4:26.**
- GB – Mason Crosby 44-yard field goal, 7:24. Packers 9–7. **Drive: 6 plays, 36 yards, 2:20.**
- GB – Davante Adams 5-yard pass from Aaron Rodgers (Mason Crosby kick), 1:07. Packers 16–7. **Drive: 9 plays, 81 yards, 4:48.**
- CIN – Ja'Marr Chase 70-yard pass from Joe Burrow (Evan McPherson kick), 0:36. Packers 16–14. **Drive: 2 plays, 75 yards, 0:31.**

**Third quarter**

- GB – Mason Crosby 44-yard field goal, 5:45. Packers 19–14. **Drive: 12 plays, 56 yards, 7:38.**

**Fourth quarter**

- GB – Mason Crosby 22-yard field goal, 11:20. Packers 22–14. **Drive: 7 plays, 81 yards, 3:48.**
- CIN – Joe Mixon 8-yard run (Joe Burrow–Tee Higgins pass), 3:27. Tied 22–22. **Drive: 13 plays, 75 yards, 7:53.**

**Overtime**

- GB – Mason Crosby 49-yard field goal, 1:55. Packers 25–22. **Drive: 6 plays, 29 yards, 2:19.**

**Top passers**

- GB – Aaron Rodgers – 27/39, 344 yards, 2 TD, INT
- CIN – Joe Burrow – 26/38, 281 yards, 2 TD, 2 INT

**Top rushers**

- GB – Aaron Jones – 14 rushes, 103 yards
- CIN – Samaje Perine – 11 rushes, 59 yards

**Top receivers**

- GB – Davante Adams – 11 receptions, 206 yards, TD
- CIN – Ja'Marr Chase – 6 receptions, 159 yards, TD

==== Week 6: at Detroit Lions ====
Week 6: Cincinnati Bengals at Detroit Lions – Game summary

Quarter	1	2	3	4	Total
**Bengals**	7	3	10	14	**34**
Lions	0	0	0	11	**11**

at Ford Field, Detroit, Michigan

- Date: October 17
- Game time: 1:00 p.m. EDT
- Game weather: None (indoor stadium)
- Game attendance: 50,831
- Referee: Shawn Hochuli
- TV announcers (Fox): Chris Myers, Daryl Johnston and Jen Hale
- Recap, Game Book

Game information

**First quarter**

- CIN – Chris Evans 24-yard pass from Joe Burrow (Evan McPherson kick), 8:26. Bengals 7–0. **Drive: 8 plays, 61 yards, 4:20.**

**Second quarter**

- CIN – Evan McPherson 38-yard field goal, 0:00. Bengals 10–0. **Drive: 9 plays, 56 yards, 1:21.**

**Third quarter**

- CIN – Joe Mixon 40-yard pass from Joe Burrow (Evan McPherson kick), 10:40. Bengals 17–0. **Drive: 8 plays, 75 yards, 4:20.**
- CIN – Evan McPherson 40-yard field goal, 3:38. Bengals 20–0. **Drive: 11 plays, 58 yards, 5:35.**

**Fourth quarter**

- CIN – C. J. Uzomah 2-yard pass from Joe Burrow (Evan McPherson kick), 12:38. Bengals 27–0. **Drive: 8 plays, 95 yards, 4:52.**
- DET – Austin Seibert 35-yard field goal, 8:36. Bengals 27–3. **Drive: 13 plays, 58 yards, 4:02.**
- CIN – Auden Tate 7-yard pass from Brandon Allen (Evan McPherson kick), 5:16. Bengals 34–3. **Drive: 5 plays, 44 yards, 3:20.**
- DET – D'Andre Swift 1-yard run (Jared Goff–Amon-Ra St. Brown pass), 2:15. Bengals 34–11. **Drive: 13 plays, 75 yards, 3:01.**

**Top passers**

- CIN – Joe Burrow – 19/29, 271 yards, 3 TD, INT
- DET – Jared Goff – 28/42, 202 yards, INT

**Top rushers**

- CIN – Joe Mixon – 18 rushes, 94 yards
- DET – D'Andre Swift – 13 rushes, 24 yards, TD

**Top receivers**

- CIN – Ja'Marr Chase – 4 receptions, 97 yards
- DET – T. J. Hockenson – 8 receptions, 74 yards

==== Week 7: at Baltimore Ravens ====
Week 7: Cincinnati Bengals at Baltimore Ravens – Game summary

Quarter	1	2	3	4	Total
**Bengals**	3	10	14	14	**41**
Ravens	0	10	7	0	**17**

at M&T Bank Stadium, Baltimore, Maryland

- Date: October 24
- Game time: 1:00 p.m. EDT
- Game weather: Cloudy, 61 °F (16 °C)
- Game attendance: 70,659
- Referee: Tony Corrente
- TV announcers (CBS): Kevin Harlan, Trent Green and Melanie Collins
- Recap, Game Book

Game information

**First quarter**

- CIN – Evan McPherson 52-yard field goal, 5:08. Bengals 3–0. **Drive: 8 plays, 23 yards, 3:54.**

**Second quarter**

- BAL – Justin Tucker 45-yard field goal, 14:03. Tied 3–3. **Drive: 8 plays, 50 yards, 3:27.**
- CIN – C. J. Uzomah 55-yard pass from Joe Burrow (Evan McPherson kick), 6:29. Bengals 10–3. **Drive: 2 plays, 80 yards, 0:37.**
- BAL – Devonta Freeman 1-yard run (Justin Tucker kick), 1:51. Tied 10–10. **Drive: 10 plays, 75 yards, 4:38.**
- CIN – Evan McPherson 30-yard field goal, 0:03. Bengals 13–10. **Drive: 10 plays, 63 yards, 1:48.**

**Third quarter**

- BAL – Marquise Brown 39-yard pass from Lamar Jackson (Justin Tucker kick), 13:20. Ravens 17–13. **Drive: 3 plays, 75 yards, 1:40.**
- CIN – C. J. Uzomah 32-yard pass from Joe Burrow (Evan McPherson kick), 11:06. Bengals 20–17. **Drive: 4 plays, 75 yards, 2:14.**
- CIN – Ja'Marr Chase 82-yard pass from Joe Burrow (Evan McPherson kick), 5:48. Bengals 27–17. **Drive: 3 plays, 90 yards, 1:39.**

**Fourth quarter**

- CIN – Joe Mixon 21-yard run (Evan McPherson kick), 9:24. Bengals 34–17. **Drive: 4 plays, 38 yards, 2:15.**
- CIN – Samaje Perine 46-yard run (Evan McPherson kick), 6:59. Bengals 41–17. **Drive: 2 plays, 44 yards, 0:54.**

**Top passers**

- CIN – Joe Burrow – 23/38, 416 yards, 3 TD, INT
- BAL – Lamar Jackson – 15/31, 257 yards, TD

**Top rushers**

- CIN – Joe Mixon – 12 rushes, 59 yards, TD
- BAL – Lamar Jackson – 12 rushes, 88 yards

**Top receivers**

- CIN – Ja'Marr Chase – 8 receptions, 201 yards, TD
- BAL – Marquise Brown – 5 receptions, 80 yards, TD

This was Cincinnati's first win in Baltimore since 2017.

==== Week 8: at New York Jets ====
Week 8: Cincinnati Bengals at New York Jets – Game summary

Quarter	1	2	3	4	Total
Bengals	0	17	7	7	**31**
**Jets**	7	7	3	17	**34**

at MetLife Stadium, East Rutherford, New Jersey

- Date: October 31
- Game time: 1:00 p.m. EDT
- Game weather: Partly cloudy, 64 °F (18 °C)
- Game attendance: 67,503
- Referee: Craig Wrolstad
- TV announcers (CBS): Kevin Harlan, Trent Green and Melanie Collins
- Recap, Game Book

Game information

**First quarter**

- NYJ – Michael Carter 8-yard run (Matt Ammendola kick), 8:38. Jets 7–0. **Drive: 10 plays, 75 yards, 6:22.**

**Second quarter**

- CIN – Joe Mixon 1-yard run (Evan McPherson kick), 14:57. Tied 7–7. **Drive: 4 plays, 15 yards, 1:31.**
- CIN – Ja'Marr Chase 2-yard pass from Joe Burrow (Evan McPherson kick), 3:21. Bengals 14–7. **Drive: 8 plays, 70 yards, 4:02.**
- CIN – Evan McPherson 21-yard field goal, 1:51. Bengals 17–7. **Drive: 5 plays, 50 yards, 0:49.**
- NYJ – Braxton Berrios 8-yard pass from Mike White (Matt Ammendola kick), 0:15. Bengals 17–14. **Drive: 8 plays, 67 yards, 1:36.**

**Third quarter**

- NYJ – Matt Ammendola 24-yard field goal, 5:17. Tied 17–17. **Drive: 13 plays, 82 yards, 6:59.**
- CIN – Joe Mixon 8-yard pass from Joe Burrow (Evan McPherson kick), 3:11. Bengals 24–17. **Drive: 4 plays, 75 yards, 2:06.**

**Fourth quarter**

- NYJ – Matt Ammendola 24-yard field goal, 12:28. Bengals 24–20. **Drive: 10 plays, 69 yards, 5:43.**
- CIN – Tyler Boyd 10-yard pass from Joe Burrow (Evan McPherson kick), 7:29. Bengals 31–20. **Drive: 12 plays, 75 yards, 4:59.**
- NYJ – Ty Johnson 19-yard pass from Mike White (pass failed), 4:36. Bengals 31–26. **Drive: 8 plays, 75 yards, 2:53.**
- NYJ – Tyler Kroft 13-yard pass from Mike White (Jamison Crowder–Mike White pass), 3:45. Jets 34–31. **Drive: 2 plays, 14 yards, 0:47.**

**Top passers**

- CIN – Joe Burrow – 21/34, 259 yards, 3 TD, INT
- NYJ – Mike White – 37/45, 405 yards, 3 TD, 2 INT

**Top rushers**

- CIN – Joe Mixon – 14 rushes, 33 yards, TD
- NYJ – Michael Carter – 15 rushes, 77 yards, TD

**Top receivers**

- CIN – Tee Higgins – 4 receptions, 97 yards
- NYJ – Michael Carter – 9 receptions, 95 yards

==== Week 9: vs. Cleveland Browns ====
Week 9: Cleveland Browns at Cincinnati Bengals – Game summary

Quarter	1	2	3	4	Total
**Browns**	7	17	10	7	**41**
Bengals	7	3	0	6	**16**

at Paul Brown Stadium, Cincinnati, Ohio

- Date: November 7
- Game time: 1:00 p.m. EST
- Game weather: Partly sunny, 60 °F (16 °C)
- Game attendance: 65,451
- Referee: Scott Novak
- TV announcers (CBS): Jim Nantz, Tony Romo and Tracy Wolfson
- Recap, Game Book

Game information

**First quarter**

- CLE – Denzel Ward 99-yard interception return (Chase McLaughlin kick), 8:43. Browns 7–0.
- CIN – Joe Mixon 11-yard run (Evan McPherson kick), 4:10. Tied 7–7. **Drive: 9 plays, 75 yards, 4:33.**

**Second quarter**

- CLE – Nick Chubb 1-yard run (Chase McLaughlin kick), 14:45. Browns 14–7. **Drive: 9 plays, 75 yards, 4:25.**
- CLE – Donovan Peoples-Jones 60-yard pass from Baker Mayfield (Chase McLaughlin kick), 10:10. Browns 21–7. **Drive: 1 play, 60 yards, 0:08.**
- CLE – Chase McLaughlin 28-yard field goal, 4:10. Browns 24–7. **Drive: 6 plays, 20 yards, 3:21.**
- CIN – Evan McPherson 27-yard field goal, 0:02. Browns 24–10. **Drive: 10 plays, 68 yards, 4:08.**

**Third quarter**

- CLE – Nick Chubb 70-yard run (Chase McLaughlin kick), 8:00. Browns 31–10. **Drive: 2 plays, 70 yards, 0:14.**
- CLE – Chase McLaughlin 24-yard field goal, 5:14. Browns 34–10. **Drive: 4 plays, 2 yards, 1:20.**

**Fourth quarter**

- CIN – Joe Mixon 2-yard run (run failed), 13:51. Browns 34–16. **Drive: 7 plays, 60 yards, 2:16.**
- CLE – David Njoku 18-yard pass from Baker Mayfield (Chase McLaughlin kick), 4:27. Browns 41–16. **Drive: 6 plays, 30 yards, 2:32.**

**Top passers**

- CLE – Baker Mayfield – 14/21, 218 yards, 2 TD
- CIN – Joe Burrow – 28/40, 282 yards, 2 INT

**Top rushers**

- CLE – Nick Chubb – 14 rushes, 137 yards, 2 TD
- CIN – Joe Mixon – 13 rushes, 64 yards, 2 TD

**Top receivers**

- CLE – Donovan Peoples-Jones – 2 receptions, 86 yards, TD
- CIN – Tee Higgins – 6 receptions, 78 yards

==== Week 11: at Las Vegas Raiders ====
Week 11: Cincinnati Bengals at Las Vegas Raiders – Game summary

Quarter	1	2	3	4	Total
**Bengals**	3	7	3	19	**32**
Raiders	3	3	0	7	**13**

at Allegiant Stadium, Paradise, Nevada

- Date: November 21
- Game time: 4:05 p.m. EST/1:05 p.m. PST
- Game weather: None (indoor stadium)
- Game attendance: 61,712
- Referee: Jerome Boger
- TV announcers (CBS): Ian Eagle, Charles Davis and Evan Washburn
- Recap, Game Book

Game information

**First quarter**

- LV – Daniel Carlson 26-yard field goal, 10:37. Raiders 3–0. **Drive: 4 plays, 1 yard, 1:23.**
- CIN – Evan McPherson 54-yard field goal, 7:36. Tied 3–3. **Drive: 7 plays, 39 yards, 3:01.**

**Second quarter**

- LV – Daniel Carlson 47-yard field goal, 11:06. Raiders 6–3. **Drive: 8 plays, 32 yards, 3:44.**
- CIN – Joe Mixon 11-yard run (Evan McPherson kick), 4:15. Bengals 10–6. **Drive: 12 plays, 72 yards, 6:51.**

**Third quarter**

- CIN – Evan McPherson 53-yard field goal, 6:04. Bengals 13–6. **Drive: 9 plays, 50 yards, 5:34.**

**Fourth quarter**

- CIN – Evan McPherson 51-yard field goal, 13:17. Bengals 16–6. **Drive: 10 plays, 46 yards, 5:23.**
- LV – Foster Moreau 19-yard pass from Derek Carr (Daniel Carlson kick), 11:42. Bengals 16–13. **Drive: 3 plays, 75 yards, 1:35.**
- CIN – Ja'Marr Chase 6-yard pass from Joe Burrow (kick failed), 5:03. Bengals 22–13. **Drive: 12 plays, 62 yards, 6:39.**
- CIN – Joe Mixon 20-yard run (Evan McPherson kick), 3:51. Bengals 29–13. **Drive: 2 plays, 27 yards, 0:52.**
- CIN – Evan McPherson 47-yard field goal, 1:04. Bengals 32–13. **Drive: 4 plays, 2 yards, 0:19.**

**Top passers**

- CIN – Joe Burrow – 20/29, 148 yards, TD
- LV – Derek Carr – 19/27, 215 yards, TD, INT

**Top rushers**

- CIN – Joe Mixon – 30 rushes, 123 yards, 2 TD
- LV – Josh Jacobs – 9 rushes, 37 yards

**Top receivers**

- CIN – Tyler Boyd – 6 receptions, 49 yards
- LV – Darren Waller – 7 receptions, 116 yards

==== Week 12: vs. Pittsburgh Steelers ====
Week 12: Pittsburgh Steelers at Cincinnati Bengals – Game summary

Quarter	1	2	3	4	Total
Steelers	3	0	0	7	**10**
**Bengals**	10	21	3	7	**41**

at Paul Brown Stadium, Cincinnati, Ohio

- Date: November 28
- Game time: 1:00 p.m. EST
- Game weather: Sunny, 44 °F (7 °C)
- Game attendance: 63,238
- Referee: Bill Vinovich
- TV announcers (CBS): Kevin Harlan, Trent Green and Melanie Collins
- Recap, Game Book

Game information

**First quarter**

- CIN – Joe Burrow 8-yard run (Evan McPherson kick), 9:29. Bengals 7–0. **Drive: 10 plays, 75 yards, 5:31.**
- CIN – Evan McPherson 31-yard field goal, 6:01. Bengals 10–0. **Drive: 4 plays, −8 yards, 1:55.**
- PIT – Chris Boswell 40-yard field goal, 2:17. Bengals 10–3. **Drive: 8 plays, 53 yards, 3:44.**

**Second quarter**

- CIN – Tee Higgins 32-yard pass from Joe Burrow (Evan McPherson kick), 14:15. Bengals 17–3. **Drive: 6 plays, 75 yards, 3:02.**
- CIN – Joe Mixon 1-yard run (Evan McPherson kick), 2:43. Bengals 24–3. **Drive: 14 plays, 84 yards, 7:35.**
- CIN – Mike Hilton 24-yard interception return (Evan McPherson kick), 0:30. Bengals 31–3.

**Third quarter**

- CIN – Evan McPherson 51-yard field goal, 2:35. Bengals 34–3. **Drive: 8 plays, 12 yards, 3:48.**

**Fourth quarter**

- CIN – Joe Mixon 1-yard run (Evan McPherson kick), 13:10. Bengals 41–3. **Drive: 5 plays, 65 yards, 2:57.**
- PIT – Pat Freiermuth 15-yard pass from Ben Roethlisberger (Chris Boswell kick), 2:59. Bengals 41–10. **Drive: 9 plays, 69 yards, 3:12.**

**Top passers**

- PIT – Ben Roethlisberger – 24/41, 263 yards, TD, 2 INT
- CIN – Joe Burrow – 20/24, 190 yards, TD, INT

**Top rushers**

- PIT – Najee Harris – 8 rushes, 23 yards
- CIN – Joe Mixon – 28 rushes, 165 yards, 2 TD

**Top receivers**

- PIT – Diontae Johnson – 9 receptions, 95 yards
- CIN – Tee Higgins – 6 receptions, 114 yards, TD

With the win, the Bengals improved to 7–4 and swept the Steelers for the first time since 2009.

==== Week 13: vs. Los Angeles Chargers ====
Week 13: Los Angeles Chargers at Cincinnati Bengals – Game summary

Quarter	1	2	3	4	Total
**Chargers**	16	8	0	17	**41**
Bengals	0	13	9	0	**22**

at Paul Brown Stadium, Cincinnati, Ohio

- Date: December 5
- Game time: 1:00 p.m. EST
- Game weather: Cloudy, 51 °F (11 °C)
- Game attendance: 51,414
- Referee: Shawn Hochuli
- TV announcers (CBS): Ian Eagle, Charles Davis and Evan Washburn
- Recap, Game Book

Game information

**First quarter**

- LAC – Keenan Allen 4-yard pass from Justin Herbert (kick failed), 11:31. Chargers 6–0. **Drive: 9 plays, 55 yards, 3:29.**
- LAC – Dustin Hopkins 43-yard field goal, 6:28. Chargers 9–0. **Drive: 4 plays, 4 yards, 2:19.**
- LAC – Keenan Allen 7-yard pass from Justin Herbert (Dustin Hopkins kick), 1:34. Chargers 16–0. **Drive: 5 plays, 73 yards, 2:55.**

**Second quarter**

- LAC – Jalen Guyton 44-yard pass from Justin Herbert (Keenan Allen–Justin Herbert pass), 10:12. Chargers 24–0. **Drive: 3 plays, 58 yards, 1:25.**
- CIN – Tee Higgins 29-yard pass from Joe Burrow (kick failed), 7:39. Chargers 24–6. **Drive: 6 plays, 75 yards, 2:33.**
- CIN – Joe Burrow 6-yard run (Evan McPherson kick), 2:40. Chargers 24–13. **Drive: 3 plays, 19 yards, 1:29.**

**Third quarter**

- CIN – Evan McPherson 48-yard field goal, 9:53. Chargers 24–16. **Drive: 10 plays, 45 yards, 5:07.**
- CIN – Joe Mixon 7-yard run (run failed), 7:10. Chargers 24–22. **Drive: 5 plays, 32 yards, 1:50.**

**Fourth quarter**

- LAC – Tevaughn Campbell 61-yard fumble return (Dustin Hopkins kick), 13:43. Chargers 31–22.
- LAC – Austin Ekeler 1-yard run (Dustin Hopkins kick), 10:49. Chargers 38–22. **Drive: 4 plays, 53 yards, 2:03.**
- LAC – Dustin Hopkins 43-yard field goal, 1:10. Chargers 41–22. **Drive: 7 plays, 15 yards, 3:49.**

**Top passers**

- LAC – Justin Herbert – 26/35, 317 yards, 3 TD, INT
- CIN – Joe Burrow – 24/40, 300 yards, TD, 2 INT

**Top rushers**

- LAC – Austin Ekeler – 14 rushes, 59 yards, TD
- CIN – Joe Mixon – 19 rushes, 54 yards, TD

**Top receivers**

- LAC – Mike Williams – 5 receptions, 110 yards
- CIN – Tee Higgins – 9 receptions, 138 yards, TD

==== Week 14: vs. San Francisco 49ers ====
Week 14: San Francisco 49ers at Cincinnati Bengals – Game summary

Quarter	1	2	3	4	OT	Total
**49ers**	3	14	3	0	6	**26**
Bengals	3	3	0	14	3	**23**

at Paul Brown Stadium, Cincinnati, Ohio

- Date: December 12
- Game time: 4:25 p.m. EST
- Game weather: Sunny, 45 °F (7 °C)
- Game attendance: 50,481
- Referee: Craig Wrolstad
- TV announcers (CBS): Greg Gumbel, Adam Archuleta and AJ Ross
- Recap, Game Book

Game information

**First quarter**

- SF – Robbie Gould 33-yard field goal, 6:37. 49ers 3–0. **Drive: 4 plays, 8 yards, 2:33.**
- CIN – Evan McPherson 37-yard field goal, 0:31. Tied 3–3. **Drive: 11 plays, 67 yards, 6:06.**

**Second quarter**

- SF – Deebo Samuel 27-yard run (Robbie Gould kick), 12:05. 49ers 10–3. **Drive: 6 plays, 75 yards, 3:26.**
- CIN – Evan McPherson 28-yard field goal, 1:42. 49ers 10–6. **Drive: 12 plays, 53 yards, 6:06.**
- SF – George Kittle 14-yard pass from Jimmy Garoppolo (Robbie Gould kick), 0:18. 49ers 17–6. **Drive: 4 plays, 31 yards, 0:39.**

**Third quarter**

- SF – Robbie Gould 24-yard field goal, 7:43. 49ers 20–6. **Drive: 12 plays, 69 yards, 5:17.**

**Fourth quarter**

- CIN – Ja'Marr Chase 17-yard pass from Joe Burrow (Evan McPherson kick), 9:20. 49ers 20–13. **Drive: 6 plays, 66 yards, 2:32.**
- CIN – Ja'Marr Chase 32-yard pass from Joe Burrow (Evan McPherson kick), 1:19. Tied 20–20. **Drive: 7 plays, 87 yards, 1:21.**

**Overtime**

- CIN – Evan McPherson 41-yard field goal, 6:15. Bengals 23–20. **Drive: 7 plays, 52 yards, 3:45.**
- SF – Brandon Aiyuk 12-yard pass from Jimmy Garoppolo, 1:53. 49ers 26–23. **Drive: 7 plays, 75 yards, 4:22.**

**Top passers**

- SF – Jimmy Garoppolo – 27/41, 296 yards, 2 TD
- CIN – Joe Burrow – 25/34, 348 yards, 2 TD

**Top rushers**

- SF – Jeff Wilson Jr. – 13 rushes, 56 yards
- CIN – Joe Mixon – 18 rushes, 58 yards

**Top receivers**

- SF – George Kittle – 13 receptions, 151 yards, TD
- CIN – Tee Higgins – 5 receptions, 114 yards

==== Week 15: at Denver Broncos ====
Week 15: Cincinnati Bengals at Denver Broncos – Game summary

Quarter	1	2	3	4	Total
**Bengals**	3	3	9	0	**15**
Broncos	0	3	7	0	**10**

at Empower Field at Mile High, Denver, Colorado

- Date: December 19
- Game time: 4:05 p.m. EST/2:05 p.m. MST
- Game weather: Sunny, 61 °F (16 °C)
- Game attendance: 76,134
- Referee: Adrian Hill
- TV announcers (CBS): Ian Eagle, Charles Davis and Evan Washburn
- Recap, Game Book

Game information

**First quarter**

- CIN – Evan McPherson 53-yard field goal, 6:34. Bengals 3–0. **Drive: 8 plays, 33 yards, 3:55.**

**Second quarter**

- DEN – Brandon McManus 54-yard field goal, 10:44. Tied 3–3. **Drive: 5 plays, 32 yards, 1:56.**
- CIN – Evan McPherson 58-yard field goal, 0:00. Bengals 6–3. **Drive: 2 plays, 19 yards, 0:09.**

**Third quarter**

- CIN – Evan McPherson 26-yard field goal, 6:21. Bengals 9–3. **Drive: 11 plays, 72 yards, 5:03.**
- DEN – Tim Patrick 25-yard pass from Drew Lock (Brandon McManus kick), 1:15. Broncos 10–9. **Drive: 9 plays, 75 yards, 5:06.**
- CIN – Tyler Boyd 56-yard pass from Joe Burrow (pass failed), 0:30. Bengals 15–10. **Drive: 2 plays, 68 yards, 0:45.**

**Fourth quarter**

- No scoring plays.

**Top passers**

- CIN – Joe Burrow – 15/22, 157 yards, TD
- DEN – Teddy Bridgewater – 12/22, 98 yards

**Top rushers**

- CIN – Joe Mixon – 17 rushes, 58 yards
- DEN – Javonte Williams – 15 rushes, 72 yards

**Top receivers**

- CIN – Tyler Boyd – 5 receptions, 96 yards, TD
- DEN – Albert Okwuegbunam – 3 receptions, 58 yards

==== Week 16: vs. Baltimore Ravens ====
Week 16: Baltimore Ravens at Cincinnati Bengals – Game summary

Quarter	1	2	3	4	Total
Ravens	7	7	0	7	**21**
**Bengals**	10	21	3	7	**41**

at Paul Brown Stadium, Cincinnati, Ohio

- Date: December 26
- Game time: 1:00 p.m. EST
- Game weather: Mostly sunny, 53 °F (12 °C)
- Game attendance: 63,922
- Referee: Clete Blakeman
- TV announcers (CBS): Kevin Harlan, Trent Green and Melanie Collins
- Recap, Game Book

Game information

**First quarter**

- CIN – Evan McPherson 30-yard field goal, 11:06. Bengals 3–0. **Drive: 8 plays, 57 yards, 3:54.**
- BAL – Rashod Bateman 4-yard pass from Josh Johnson (Justin Tucker kick), 5:56. Ravens 7–3. **Drive: 12 plays, 75 yards, 5:10.**
- CIN – Joe Mixon 1-yard run (Evan McPherson kick), 0:27. Bengals 10–7. **Drive: 10 plays, 74 yards, 5:29.**

**Second quarter**

- CIN – Tyler Boyd 68-yard pass from Joe Burrow (Evan McPherson kick), 13:18. Bengals 17–7. **Drive: 2 plays, 71 yards, 0:53.**
- CIN – Joe Mixon 9-yard pass from Joe Burrow (Evan McPherson kick), 7:03. Bengals 24–7. **Drive: 7 plays, 58 yards, 4:00.**
- BAL – Devonta Freeman 2-yard run (Justin Tucker kick), 1:38. Bengals 24–14. **Drive: 13 plays, 90 yards, 5:25.**
- CIN – Tee Higgins 1-yard pass from Joe Burrow (Evan McPherson kick), 0:21. Bengals 31–14. **Drive: 7 plays, 75 yards, 1:17.**

**Third quarter**

- CIN – Evan McPherson 36-yard field goal, 0:40. Bengals 34–14. **Drive: 19 plays, 68 yards, 10:29.**

**Fourth quarter**

- BAL – Mark Andrews 18-yard pass from Josh Johnson (Justin Tucker kick), 14:55. Bengals 34–21. **Drive: 5 plays, 60 yards, 0:45.**
- CIN – Tee Higgins 10-yard pass from Joe Burrow (Evan McPherson kick), 10:05. Bengals 41–21. **Drive: 8 plays, 78 yards, 4:50.**

**Top passers**

- BAL – Josh Johnson – 28/40, 304 yards, 2 TD, INT
- CIN – Joe Burrow – 37/46, 525 yards, 4 TD

**Top rushers**

- BAL – Devonta Freeman – 6 rushes, 17 yards, TD
- CIN – Joe Mixon – 16 rushes, 61 yards, TD

**Top receivers**

- BAL – Mark Andrews – 8 receptions, 125 yards, TD
- CIN – Tee Higgins – 12 receptions, 194 yards, 2 TD

With the win this marked the first time since 2015 that the Bengals swept the Ravens.

==== Week 17: vs. Kansas City Chiefs ====
Week 17: Kansas City Chiefs at Cincinnati Bengals – Game summary

Quarter	1	2	3	4	Total
Chiefs	14	14	0	3	**31**
**Bengals**	7	10	7	10	**34**

at Paul Brown Stadium, Cincinnati, Ohio

- Date: January 2
- Game time: 1:00 p.m. EST
- Game weather: Cloudy, 33 °F (1 °C)
- Game attendance: 64,505
- Referee: Ronald Torbert
- TV announcers (CBS): Jim Nantz, Tony Romo and Tracy Wolfson
- Recap, Game Book

Game information

**First quarter**

- KC – Demarcus Robinson 29-yard pass from Patrick Mahomes (Harrison Butker kick), 9:21. Chiefs 7–0. **Drive: 5 plays, 72 yards, 2:38.**
- KC – Travis Kelce 3-yard pass from Patrick Mahomes (Harrison Butker kick), 2:50. Chiefs 14–0. **Drive: 7 plays, 63 yards, 3:50.**
- CIN – Ja'Marr Chase 72-yard pass from Joe Burrow (Evan McPherson kick), 2:01. Chiefs 14–7. **Drive: 2 plays, 75 yards, 0:49.**

**Second quarter**

- KC – Darrel Williams 1-yard run (Harrison Butker kick), 12:56. Chiefs 21–7. **Drive: 9 plays, 75 yards, 4:05.**
- CIN – Ja'Marr Chase 18-yard pass from Joe Burrow (Evan McPherson kick), 7:42. Chiefs 21–14. **Drive: 9 plays, 75 yards, 5:14.**
- KC – Darrel Williams 1-yard run (Harrison Butker kick), 2:18. Chiefs 28–14. **Drive: 9 plays, 73 yards, 5:24.**
- CIN – Evan McPherson 46-yard field goal, 0:41. Chiefs 28–17. **Drive: 11 plays, 47 yards, 1:37.**

**Third quarter**

- CIN – Ja'Marr Chase 69-yard pass from Joe Burrow (Evan McPherson kick), 13:30. Chiefs 28–24. **Drive: 3 plays, 75 yards, 1:30.**

**Fourth quarter**

- CIN – Tyler Boyd 5-yard pass from Joe Burrow (Evan McPherson kick), 11:44. Bengals 31–28. **Drive: 8 plays, 86 yards, 4:27.**
- KC – Harrison Butker 34-yard field goal, 6:01. Tied 31–31. **Drive: 11 plays, 52 yards, 5:43.**
- CIN – Evan McPherson 20-yard field goal, 0:00. Bengals 34–31. **Drive: 15 plays, 74 yards, 6:01.**

**Top passers**

- KC – Patrick Mahomes – 26/35, 259 yards, 2 TD
- CIN – Joe Burrow – 30/39, 446 yards, 4 TD

**Top rushers**

- KC – Darrel Williams – 14 rushes, 88 yards, 2 TD
- CIN – Joe Mixon – 12 rushes, 46 yards

**Top receivers**

- KC – Mecole Hardman – 1 reception, 53 yards
- CIN – Ja'Marr Chase – 11 receptions, 266 yards, 3 TD

With the win, the Bengals clinched a playoff berth for the first time since 2015, and won their first AFC North title since 2015 as well.

==== Week 18: at Cleveland Browns ====
Week 18: Cincinnati Bengals at Cleveland Browns – Game summary

Quarter	1	2	3	4	Total
Bengals	0	7	3	6	**16**
**Browns**	7	7	0	7	**21**

at FirstEnergy Stadium, Cleveland, Ohio

- Date: January 9
- Game time: 1:00 p.m. EST
- Game weather: Rain, 37 °F (3 °C)
- Game attendance: 67,431
- Referee: Bill Vinovich
- TV announcers (Fox): Kenny Albert, Jonathan Vilma and Lindsay Czarniak
- Recap, GameBook

Game information

**First quarter**

- CLE – Jarvis Landry 26-yard pass from Case Keenum (Chase McLaughlin kick), 0:56. Browns 7–0. **Drive: 6 plays, 79 yards, 3:18.**

**Second quarter**

- CLE – D'Ernest Johnson 4-yard run (Chase McLaughlin kick), 11:22. Browns 14–0. **Drive: 6 plays, 58 yards, 2:42.**
- CIN – Trayvon Henderson 29-yard fumble return (Elliott Fry kick), 3:28. Browns 14–7.

**Third quarter**

- CIN – Elliott Fry 36-yard field goal, 5:01. Browns 14–10. **Drive: 14 plays, 52 yards, 8:36.**

**Fourth quarter**

- CLE – Demetric Felton 10-yard pass from Case Keenum (Chase McLaughlin kick), 7:14. Browns 21–10. **Drive: 10 plays, 46 yards, 6:00.**
- CIN – Chris Evans 4-yard pass from Brandon Allen (pass failed), 2:26. Browns 21–16. **Drive: 13 plays, 75 yards, 4:48.**

**Top passers**

- CIN – Brandon Allen – 15/29, 136 yards, TD
- CLE – Case Keenum – 17/24, 176 yards, 2 TD, INT

**Top rushers**

- CIN – Trayveon Williams – 9 rushes, 38 yards
- CLE – D'Ernest Johnson – 25 rushes, 123 yards, TD

**Top receivers**

- CIN – Trent Taylor – 2 reception, 41 yards
- CLE – Jarvis Landry – 6 receptions, 75 yards, TD

With the loss, the Bengals finished the regular season at 10–7 and were swept by the Browns in back-to-back seasons for the first time since 1994 and 1995.

== Standings ==
=== Division ===
AFC North
	W	L	T	PCT	DIV	CONF	PF	PA	STK
^{(4)} Cincinnati Bengals	10	7	0	.588	4–2	8–4	460	376	L1
^{(7)} Pittsburgh Steelers	9	7	1	.559	4–2	7–5	343	398	W2
Cleveland Browns	8	9	0	.471	3–3	5–7	349	371	W1
Baltimore Ravens	8	9	0	.471	1–5	5–7	387	392	L6

=== Conference ===
AFC
#	Team	Division	W	L	T	PCT	DIV	CONF	SOS	SOV	STK
Division winners
1 (Note: Tennessee finished ahead of Kansas City based on head-to-head victory, claiming the No. 1 seed.)	Tennessee Titans	South	12	5	0	.706	5–1	8–4	.472	.480	W3
2	Kansas City Chiefs	West	12	5	0	.706	5–1	7–5	.538	.517	W1
3	Buffalo Bills	East	11	6	0	.647	5–1	7–5	.472	.428	W4
4	Cincinnati Bengals	North	10	7	0	.588	4–2	8–4	.472	.462	L1
Wild cards
5 (Note: Las Vegas claimed the No. 5 seed over New England based on win percentage in common games (5–1 vs. 2–4 against: Miami, Dallas, LA Chargers, Cleveland, and Indianapolis).)	Las Vegas Raiders	West	10	7	0	.588	3–3	8–4	.510	.515	W4
6	New England Patriots	East	10	7	0	.588	3–3	8–4	.481	.394	L1
7	Pittsburgh Steelers	North	9	7	1	.559	4–2	7–5	.521	.490	W2
Did not qualify for the postseason
8 (Note: Indianapolis finished ahead of Miami and Los Angeles based on conference record (7–5 vs. 6–6).)	Indianapolis Colts	South	9	8	0	.529	3–3	7–5	.495	.431	L2
9 (Note: Miami finished ahead of LA Chargers based on win percentage in common games (5–1 vs. 2–4 against: New England, Las Vegas, Houston, Baltimore, and NY Giants).)	Miami Dolphins	East	9	8	0	.529	4–2	6–6	.464	.379	W1
10	Los Angeles Chargers	West	9	8	0	.529	3–3	6–6	.510	.500	L1
11 (Note: Cleveland finished ahead of Baltimore based on division record (3–3 vs. 1–5).)	Cleveland Browns	North	8	9	0	.471	3–3	5–7	.514	.415	W1
12	Baltimore Ravens	North	8	9	0	.471	1–5	5–7	.531	.460	L6
13	Denver Broncos	West	7	10	0	.412	1–5	3–9	.484	.357	L4
14 (Note: NY Jets finished ahead of Houston based on head-to-head victory.)	New York Jets	East	4	13	0	.235	0–6	4–8	.512	.426	L2
15	Houston Texans	South	4	13	0	.235	3–3	4–8	.498	.397	L2
16	Jacksonville Jaguars	South	3	14	0	.176	1–5	3–9	.512	.569	W1
Tiebreakers (Note: When breaking ties for three or more teams under the NFL's rules, they are first broken within divisions, then comparing only the highest-ranked remaining team from each division.)

== Postseason ==
=== Schedule ===
Round	Date	Opponent (seed)	Result	Record	Venue	Recap
Wild Card	January 15	Las Vegas Raiders (5)	W 26–19	1–0	Paul Brown Stadium	Recap
Divisional	January 22	at Tennessee Titans (1)	W 19–16	2–0	Nissan Stadium	Recap
AFC Championship	January 30	at Kansas City Chiefs (2)	W 27–24 (OT)	3–0	Arrowhead Stadium	Recap
Super Bowl LVI	February 13	vs. Los Angeles Rams (N4)	L 20–23	3–1	SoFi Stadium	Recap

=== Game summaries ===
==== AFC Wild Card Playoffs: vs. (5) Las Vegas Raiders ====
AFC Wild Card Playoffs: (5) Las Vegas Raiders at (4) Cincinnati Bengals – Game summary

Quarter	1	2	3	4	Total
Raiders	3	10	0	6	19
Bengals	10	10	3	3	26

at Paul Brown Stadium, Cincinnati, Ohio

- Date: January 15, 2022
- Game time: 4:35 p.m. EST
- Game weather: Cloudy, 32 °F (0 °C)
- Game attendance: 66,277
- Referee: Jerome Boger
- TV announcers (NBC): Mike Tirico, Drew Brees, Kathryn Tappen, and Terry McAulay
- Recap, Game Book

Game information

First quarter

- LV – Daniel Carlson 47-yard field goal, 9:23. Raiders 3–0. Drive: 10 plays, 47 yards, 5:37.
- CIN – C. J. Uzomah 7-yard pass from Joe Burrow (Evan McPherson kick), 4:31. Bengals 7–3. Drive: 10 plays, 75 yards, 4:52.
- CIN – Evan McPherson 31-yard field goal, 1:15. Bengals 10–3. Drive: 4 plays, 2 yards, 1:46.

Second quarter

- CIN – Evan McPherson 30-yard field goal, 10:20. Bengals 13–3. Drive: 8 plays, 33 yards, 3:52.
- LV – Daniel Carlson 28-yard field goal, 7:55. Bengals 13–6. Drive: 6 plays, 51 yards, 2:25.
- CIN – Tyler Boyd 10-yard pass from Joe Burrow (Evan McPherson kick), 1:51. Bengals 20–6. Drive: 12 plays, 82 yards, 6:04.
- LV – Zay Jones 14-yard pass from Derek Carr (Daniel Carlson kick), 0:13. Bengals 20–13. Drive: 11 plays, 80 yards, 1:38.

Third quarter

- CIN – Evan McPherson 43-yard field goal, 10:56. Bengals 23–13. Drive: 9 plays, 40 yards, 4:04.

Fourth quarter

- LV – Daniel Carlson 34-yard field goal, 14:17. Bengals 23–16. Drive: 13 plays, 57 yards, 7:30.
- CIN – Evan McPherson 38-yard field goal, 6:46. Bengals 26–16. Drive: 13 plays, 65 yards, 7:31.
- LV – Daniel Carlson 28-yard field goal, 3:34. Bengals 26–19. Drive: 12 plays, 67 yards, 3:12.

Top passers

- LV – Derek Carr – 29/54, 310 yards, TD, INT
- CIN – Joe Burrow – 24/34, 244 yards, 2 TD

Top rushers

- LV – Josh Jacobs – 13 rushes, 83 yards
- CIN – Joe Mixon – 17 rushes, 48 yards

Top receivers

- LV – Darren Waller – 7 receptions, 76 yards
- CIN – Ja'Marr Chase – 9 receptions, 116 yards

With the win, the Bengals won their first playoff game since January 6, 1991.

==== AFC Divisional Playoffs: at (1) Tennessee Titans ====
AFC Divisional Playoffs: (4) Cincinnati Bengals at (1) Tennessee Titans – Game summary

Quarter	1	2	3	4	Total
Bengals	6	3	7	3	19
Titans	0	6	10	0	16

at Nissan Stadium, Nashville, Tennessee

- Date: January 22, 2022
- Game time: 4:35 p.m. EST/3:35 p.m. CST
- Game weather: Sunny, 34 °F (1 °C)
- Game attendance: 69,242
- Referee: Clete Blakeman
- TV announcers (CBS): Ian Eagle, Trent Green and Evan Washburn
- Recap, Game Book

Game information

First quarter

- CIN – Evan McPherson 38-yard field goal, 12:03. Bengals 3–0. Drive: 6 plays, 22 yards, 2:50.
- CIN – Evan McPherson 45-yard field goal, 2:11. Bengals 6–0. Drive: 6 plays, 61 yards, 3:41.

Second quarter

- TEN – Derrick Henry 3-yard run (run failed), 6:07. Tied 6–6. Drive: 9 plays, 84 yards, 5:10.
- CIN – Evan McPherson 54-yard field goal, 1:35. Bengals 9–6. Drive: 11 plays, 39 yards, 4:32.

Third quarter

- CIN – Joe Mixon 16-yard run (Evan McPherson kick), 9:34. Bengals 16–6. Drive: 9 plays, 65 yards, 5:26.
- TEN – Randy Bullock 34-yard field goal, 1:36. Bengals 16–9. Drive: 7 plays, 56 yards, 3:24.
- TEN – A. J. Brown 33-yard pass from Ryan Tannehill (Randy Bullock kick), 0:15. Tied 16–16. Drive: 2 plays, 27 yards, 1:04.

Fourth quarter

- CIN – Evan McPherson 52-yard field goal, 0:00. Bengals 19–16. Drive: 4 plays, 19 yards, 0:20.

Top passers

- CIN – Joe Burrow – 28/37, 348 yards, INT
- TEN – Ryan Tannehill – 15/24, 220 yards, TD, 3 INT

Top rushers

- CIN – Joe Mixon – 14 rushes, 54 yards, TD
- TEN – D'Onta Foreman – 4 rushes, 66 yards

Top receivers

- CIN – Ja'Marr Chase – 5 receptions, 109 yards
- TEN – A. J. Brown – 5 receptions, 142 yards, TD

This was the first time in franchise history that the Bengals won a playoff game on the road.

==== AFC Championship: at (2) Kansas City Chiefs ====
AFC Championship: (4) Cincinnati Bengals at (2) Kansas City Chiefs – Game summary

Quarter	1	2	3	4	OT	Total
Bengals	3	7	11	3	3	27
Chiefs	7	14	0	3	0	24

at Arrowhead Stadium, Kansas City, Missouri

- Date: January 30, 2022
- Game time: 3:05 p.m. EST/2:05 p.m. CST
- Game weather: Cloudy, 41 °F (5 °C)
- Game attendance: 73,377
- Referee: Bill Vinovich
- TV announcers (CBS): Jim Nantz, Tony Romo, Tracy Wolfson, Evan Washburn, Jay Feely, and Gene Steratore
- Recap, Game Book

Game information

First quarter

- KC – Tyreek Hill 10-yard pass from Patrick Mahomes (Harrison Butker kick), 7:17. Chiefs 7–0. Drive: 11 plays, 84 yards, 6:09.
- CIN – Evan McPherson 32-yard field goal, 0:36. Chiefs 7–3. Drive: 14 plays, 61 yards, 6:41.

Second quarter

- KC – Travis Kelce 5-yard pass from Patrick Mahomes (Harrison Butker kick), 12:14. Chiefs 14–3. Drive: 7 plays, 75 yards, 3:22.
- KC – Mecole Hardman 3-yard pass from Patrick Mahomes (Harrison Butker kick), 5:04. Chiefs 21–3. Drive: 8 plays, 72 yards, 4:56.
- CIN – Samaje Perine 41-yard pass from Joe Burrow (Evan McPherson kick), 1:05. Chiefs 21–10. Drive: 7 plays, 70 yards, 3:59.

Third quarter

- CIN – Evan McPherson 31-yard field goal, 2:58. Chiefs 21–13. Drive: 11 plays, 52 yards, 5:42.
- CIN – Ja'Marr Chase 2-yard pass from Joe Burrow (Joe Burrow–Trent Taylor pass), 0:14. Tied 21–21. Drive: 5 plays, 27 yards, 2:04.

Fourth quarter

- CIN – Evan McPherson 52-yard field goal, 6:04. Bengals 24–21. Drive: 11 plays, 46 yards, 6:23.
- KC – Harrison Butker 44-yard field goal, 0:00. Tied 24–24. Drive: 14 plays, 49 yards, 6:04.

Overtime

- CIN – Evan McPherson 31-yard field goal, 9:22. Bengals 27–24. Drive: 9 plays, 42 yards, 5:24.

Top passers

- CIN – Joe Burrow – 23/38, 250 yards, 2 TD, INT
- KC – Patrick Mahomes – 26/39, 275 yards, 3 TD, 2 INT

Top rushers

- CIN – Joe Mixon – 21 rushes, 88 yards
- KC – Jerick McKinnon – 12 rushes, 65 yards

Top receivers

- CIN – Tee Higgins – 6 receptions, 103 yards
- KC – Travis Kelce – 10 receptions, 95 yards, TD

Cincinnati's 18-point comeback matched a record previously set by 2006 Indianapolis Colts.

==== Super Bowl LVI: vs. (N4) Los Angeles Rams ====
Super Bowl LVI: (N4) Los Angeles Rams vs. (A4) Cincinnati Bengals – Game summary

Quarter	1	2	3	4	Total
Rams	7	6	3	7	23
Bengals	3	7	10	0	20

at SoFi Stadium, Inglewood, California

- Date: February 13, 2022
- Game time: 6:30 p.m. EST/3:30 p.m. PST
- Game weather: Clear, 82 °F (28 °C)
- Game attendance: 70,048
- Referee: Ronald Torbert
- TV announcers (NBC): Al Michaels, Cris Collinsworth, Michele Tafoya, Kathryn Tappen and Terry McAulay
- Recap, Game Book

== Statistics ==
=== Team ===
Category	Total yards	Yards per game	NFL rank (out of 32)
Passing offense	4,403	259.0	7th
Rushing offense	1,742	102.5	23rd
Total offense	6,145	361.5	13th
Passing defense	4,222	248.4	26th
Rushing defense	1,742	102.5	5th
Total defense	5,964	350.8	18th

=== Individual ===
Category	Player	Total yards
Offense
Passing	Joe Burrow	4,611
Rushing	Joe Mixon	1,205
Receiving	Ja'Marr Chase	1,455
Defense
Tackles (Solo)	Jessie Bates	67
Sacks	Trey Hendrickson	14
Interceptions	Logan Wilson	4

Statistics correct as of the end of the 2021 NFL season
