= Evan McPherson =

American football player (born 1999)

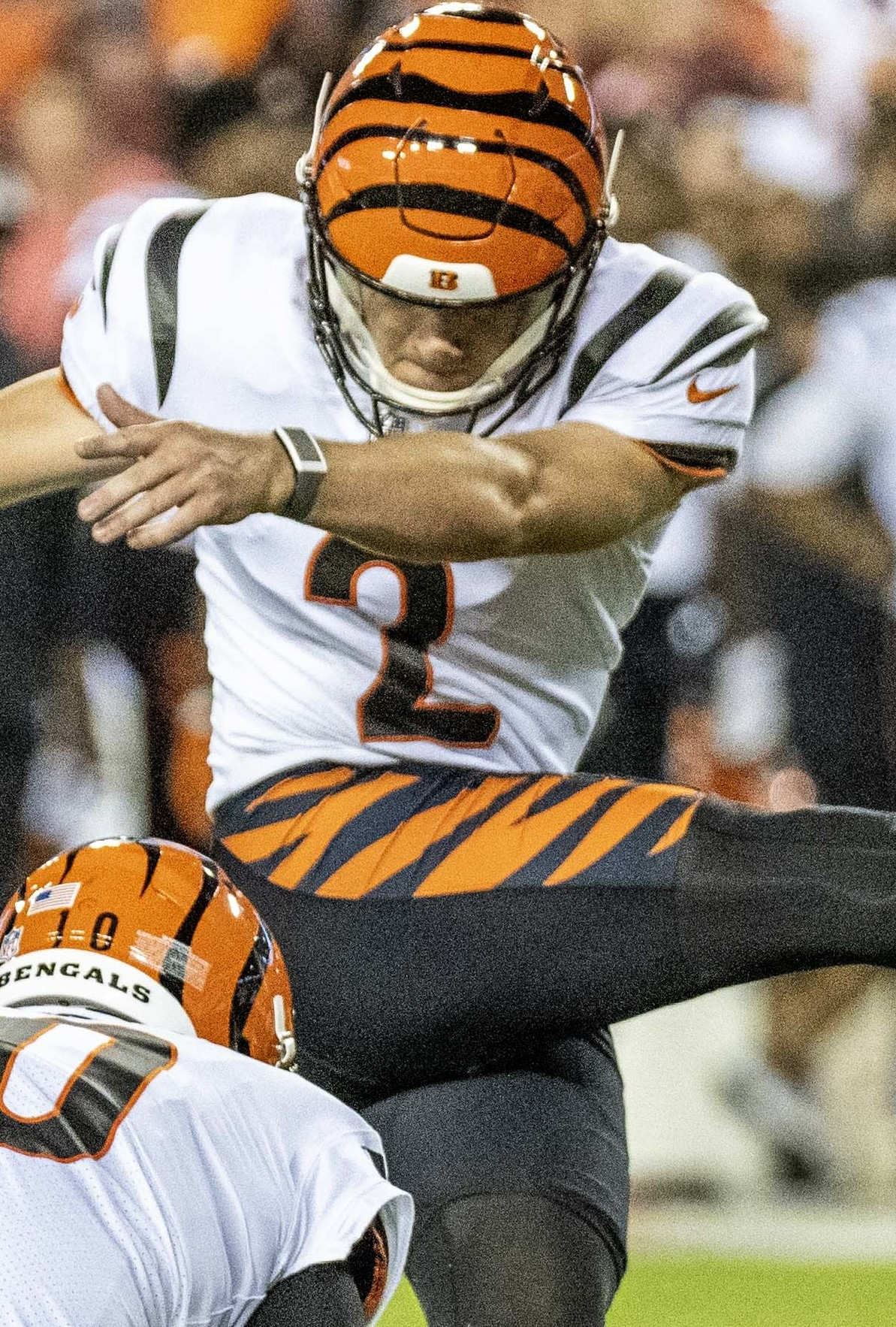
- McPherson with the Cincinnati Bengals in 2021

No. 2 – Cincinnati Bengals
- Position: Placekicker
- Roster status: Active

Personal information
- Born: July 21, 1999 (age 27); Fort Payne, Alabama, U.S.
- Listed height: 5 ft 11 in (1.80 m)
- Listed weight: 185 lb (84 kg)

Career information
- High school: Fort Payne
- College: Florida (2018–2020)
- NFL draft: 2021: 5th round, 149th overall pick

Career history
- Cincinnati Bengals (2021–present)

Awards and highlights
- PFWA All-Rookie Team (2021); NFL record: Most field goals made in a postseason: 14 (2021; tied) (Note: Tied with Adam Vinatieri)

Career NFL statistics as of Week 10, 2026
- Field goals made: 132
- Field goals attempted: 157
- Field goal %: 84.1%
- Longest field goal: 63
- Touchbacks: 242
- Stats at Pro Football Reference

Evan McPherson (mick-FEAR-suhn; born July 21, 1999) is an American professional football placekicker for the Cincinnati Bengals of the National Football League (NFL). He played college football for the Florida Gators before being drafted by the Bengals in the fifth round of the 2021 NFL draft, the only kicker to be selected that year.

During the Bengals' 2021 playoff run, McPherson tied Adam Vinatieri for most field goals made in a single postseason, with 14, and set the record for most postseason field goals made without any misses. Due to his clutch kicking, McPherson is nicknamed "Shooter" (after the Happy Gilmore character of a similar nickname) and "Money Mac."

== Early life ==
McPherson started his football career at Fort Payne High School in Fort Payne, Alabama, where he spent four seasons as the team's kicker and punter. At Fort Payne, McPherson made a 60-yard field goal and an 84-yard punt, both kicks being one yard short of the Alabama high school record. He also made the first-team All-State in 2017.

== College career ==
McPherson went on to play college football for the Florida Gators from 2018 to 2020 before choosing to forgo his senior season and enter the 2021 NFL draft. At Florida, McPherson was 51-of-60 (85.0%) on field goals, setting a Southeastern Conference record for career field goal percentage (minimum 50 attempts), and 149-of-150 on extra points. He made 5 of 8 career field goal attempts from at least 50 yards. In his three seasons with the Gators, the team recorded a 29–9 record and a 2–1 record in bowl games, including an Orange Bowl win in 2019. McPherson made all three of his field goal attempts in that game, the longest from 49 yards.

When McPherson left Florida, his career field goal percentage ranked 12th in NCAA history.

== Professional career ==
Pre-draft measurables
Height	Weight	Arm length	Hand span	Wingspan
5 ft 11 in (1.80 m)	185 lb (84 kg)	29 in (0.74 m)	9 1/8 in (0.23 m)	5 ft 11 1/8 in (1.81 m)
All values from Pro Day

=== 2021 ===
McPherson was selected by the Cincinnati Bengals in the fifth round, 149th overall, of the 2021 NFL draft. He signed his four-year rookie contract with the Bengals on May 17, 2021.

McPherson was a perfect 5/5 on field goals during the Bengals' three 2021 preseason games, including a 57-yard kick. At the end of the preseason, the Bengals released their only other kicker on the roster, Austin Seibert, and named McPherson the starter for the regular season. McPherson became the first player from Fort Payne High School ever to play in an NFL regular season game.

McPherson made his first regular-season field goal attempt, a 53-yarder, in the season-opener against the Minnesota Vikings on September 12, 2021. During overtime, McPherson kicked a 33-yard game-winning field goal to secure a 27–24 victory, earning AFC Special Teams Player of the Week honors. On November 21, McPherson tied an NFL record by making three field goals from over 50 yards in one game, going 4/4 on kicks from 54, 53, 51, and 47 yards in a 32–13 win over the Las Vegas Raiders, securing his second AFC Special Teams Player of the Week award in the process. He also set the franchise record for most 50-yard field goals made in a season, breaking the old record of 4 set by Horst Muhlmann in 1970. On December 19, McPherson set the franchise record for longest field goal for the Bengals with a 58-yard kick against the Denver Broncos.

McPherson finished the season 28-of-33 on field goal attempts (84.8%), including being 9-of-11 on field goals (81.8%) from 50+ yards. He was named to the PFWA All-Rookie Team. In the Bengals' Wild Card game against the Raiders, McPherson was 4-of-4 on field goals, assisting the team to a 26–19 victory that gave them their first postseason win in 31 years. Subsequently, in the Divisional Round, he again made 4-of-4 field goals, including two from over 50 yards. McPherson's 52-yard field goal as time expired gave the Bengals a 19–16 road victory over the Tennessee Titans to send them to their first AFC Championship Game since 1988. McPherson also became the first kicker in NFL history to kick at least four field goals in multiple games during the same postseason. During the AFC Championship Game against the Kansas City Chiefs, McPherson was again 4-of-4 on his field goal attempts, including a game winning 31-yard field goal in overtime in the 27–24 win, advancing the Bengals to Super Bowl LVI, where he kicked two more field goals in the 23–20 loss. McPherson's 14-of-14 playoff field goals set the record for most field goals made by a rookie, as well as ties the all-time record for most field goals made in a single postseason. His 12 combined 50+ yard field goals in the regular season and playoffs also set the NFL record for most combined regular season and postseason 50+ yard field goals made by one player in a single season.

=== 2022 ===
In the season-opener against the Pittsburgh Steelers, McPherson set a franchise record for longest field goal with 59 yards. However, after an injury to long snapper Clark Harris, McPherson had a potential game-winning extra point blocked and missed a 29-yard field goal in overtime, leading to a 23–20 loss. Three weeks later, he converted both field goal attempts and all three extra points in a 27–15 victory over the Miami Dolphins, earning AFC Special Teams Player of the Week honors. During week 6, McPherson kicked a 52-yard field goal in the 30–26 victory over the New Orleans Saints. He finished the season making 82.8% of his field goals, with a perfect 5/5 on field goals from 50+ yards. However, McPherson missed four extra points during the season, as well as one in the playoffs. However, he remained perfect on postseason field goals, making all his attempts in the Bengals three playoff games to push his record up to 19/19.

=== 2023 ===
In the 2023 season, McPherson converted all 40 extra point attempts and 26 of 31 field goal attempts.

=== 2024 ===
On August 16, 2024, McPherson signed a three-year, $16.5 million contract extension with the Bengals. In McPherson's Week 1 appearance, he successfully kicked a 51 yard field goal as the Bengals lost to the New England Patriots. McPherson began to struggle throughout the season with missed kicks. He was one for two on extra point attempts during the Bengals' 26–25 loss to the Kansas City Chiefs. He had another costly miss when the Baltimore Ravens defeated the Bengals 41–38 in overtime. McPherson's field goal would have avoided overtime and given the Bengals the lead. During Week 11 on Sunday Night Football against the Chargers, McPherson missed two field goal attempts, one for 48 yards and the other for 51 as the Bengals would lose 27–34. He finished the 2024 season converting 16 of 22 field goal attempts and 37 of 38 extra point attempts.

=== 2025 ===
On November 23, 2025, McPherson kicked the Bengals franchise record longest field goal with a 63-yard field goal in an eventual 26–20 loss to the New England Patriots in Week 11. In the next game against the Baltimore Ravens, he converted all six field goal attempts and two extra points during the 32–14 road victory, earning AFC Special Teams Player of the Week honors. He finished the 2025 season converting 25-of-28 field goal attempts and 41-of-44 extra point attempts.

=== 2026 ===
In Week 1 of the 2026 NFL season, McPherson went 4-of-4 on field goals, earning him AFC Special Teams Player of the Week honors. In addition, he was named AFC Special Teams Player of the Month for September. In Week 5 of the 2026 season, McPherson scored his 22nd consecutive field goal, surpassing Shayne Graham's previous record set in 2007.

== NFL career statistics ==
Legend
**Bold**	Career high
	Led the league

=== Regular season ===
General			Field goals					PATs			Kickoffs			Points
Season	Team	GP	FGM	FGA	FG%	Blck	Long	XPM	XPA	XP%	KO	Avg	TBs	Pts
2021	CIN	16	**28**	**33**	84.8	0	58	**46**	**48**	95.8	**91**	**63.9**	55	**130**
2022	CIN	16	24	29	82.8	0	59	40	44	90.9	90	62.3	51	112
2023	CIN	**17**	26	31	83.9	0	56	40	40	**100.0**	82	**63.0**	63	118
2024	CIN	12	16	22	72.7	0	56	37	38	97.4	70	62.2	54	85
2025	CIN	**17**	25	28	**89.3**	0	**63**	41	44	93.2	88	60.8	11	116
2026	CIN	9	13	14	92.9	0	58	33	33	100.0	56	61.0	8	72
Career		87	132	157	84.1	0	63	237	247	96.0	477	62.4	242	633

=== Postseason ===
General			Field goals					PATs			Kickoffs			Points
Season	Team	GP	FGM	FGA	FG%	Blck	Long	XPM	XPA	XP%	KO	Avg	TBs	Pts
2021	CIN	**4**	**14**	**14**	**100.0**	0	**54**	**6**	6	**100.0**	**24**	**64.5**	**16**	**48**
2022	CIN	3	5	5	**100.0**	0	39	**6**	**7**	85.7	15	64.3	5	21
Career		7	19	19	100.0	0	54	12	13	92.3	39	64.4	21	69

== Personal life ==
McPherson is a Christian. He is married to Gracie Groat, they have two children.

McPherson's older brother Logan was also an all-state kicker for Fort Payne High School and went on to play as a punter for Louisiana Tech University. His younger brother Alex made an All-State as a kicker with Fort Payne in 2019, and as a punter in 2020. In 2021, Alex announced his commitment to attend Auburn University. Alex was the highest-ranked kicker in the 2022 class.
