= National Register of Historic Places listings in McHenry County, North Dakota =

Location of McHenry County in North Dakota

This is a list of the National Register of Historic Places listings in McHenry County, North Dakota.

This is intended to be a complete list of the properties and districts on the National Register of Historic Places in McHenry County, North Dakota, United States. The locations of National Register properties and districts for which the latitude and longitude coordinates are included below, may be seen in a map.

There are 12 properties and districts listed on the National Register in the county.

Contents: Counties in North Dakota
Adams | Barnes | Benson | Billings | Bottineau | Bowman | Burke | Burleigh | Cass | Cavalier | Dickey | Divide | Dunn | Eddy | Emmons | Foster | Golden Valley | Grand Forks | Grant | Griggs | Hettinger | Kidder | LaMoure | Logan | McHenry | McIntosh | McKenzie | McLean | Mercer | Morton | Mountrail | Nelson | Oliver | Pembina | Pierce | Ramsey | Ransom | Renville | Richland | Rolette | Sargent | Sheridan | Sioux | Slope | Stark | Steele | Stutsman | Towner | Traill | Walsh | Ward | Wells | Williams

This National Park Service list is complete through NPS recent listings posted March 14, 2025.

== Current listings ==
	Name on the Register	Image	Date listed	Location	City or town	Description
1	Denbigh Station and Experimental Forest		June 24, 2010 (#10000380)	U.S. Route 2; 48°17′25″N 100°38′12″W	Denbigh	
2	Elliott Bridge		February 27, 1997 (#97000181)	Unnamed county road across the Souris River, approximately 4 miles north of Towner; 48°24′27″N 100°23′45″W	Towner	
3	Granville State Bank	Granville State Bank	September 13, 1977 (#77001509)	Main and 2nd Sts. 48°16′02″N 100°50′03″W	Granville	
4	Hotel Berry	Hotel Berry	October 20, 1982 (#82001343)	100 W. Central Ave. 48°03′36″N 100°55′54″W	Velva	
5	Liberty Baptist Church	Liberty Baptist Church	October 16, 1987 (#87001789)	5th and Christina Sts. 47°51′24″N 100°31′29″W	Kief	
6	Lower Souris National Wildlife Refuge Airplane Hangar	Lower Souris National Wildlife Refuge Airplane Hangar	September 20, 2011 (#11000140)	681 Salyer Rd. 48°36′40″N 100°43′10″W	Upham	
7	McHenry County Courthouse	McHenry County Courthouse	November 25, 1980 (#80002917)	In Towner; 48°20′35″N 100°24′13″W	Towner	
8	Norway Lutheran Church and Cemetery	Norway Lutheran Church and Cemetery	October 14, 1994 (#94001216)	10 miles south of Denbigh, south of the Souris River; 48°10′56″N 100°36′51″W	Denbigh	
9	Old Saint John Nepomocene Cemetery, Wrought-Iron Cross Site	Old Saint John Nepomocene Cemetery, Wrought-Iron Cross Site	October 23, 1989 (#89001683)	Address Restricted	Orrin	
10	Old Saints Peter and Paul Cemetery, Wrought-Iron Cross Site	Old Saints Peter and Paul Cemetery, Wrought-Iron Cross Site	October 23, 1989 (#89001682)	Address Restricted	Karlsruhe	
11	Alfred and Clara Sevareid House	Alfred and Clara Sevareid House	October 3, 1996 (#96001066)	405 2nd St., W. 48°03′41″N 100°55′51″W	Velva	
12	Westgaard Bridge	Westgaard Bridge	February 27, 1997 (#97000180)	Unnamed county road across the Sheyenne River, approximately 6 miles north and 1 mile east of Voltaire; 48°06′51″N 100°48′33″W	Voltaire	

== See also ==
- List of National Historic Landmarks in North Dakota
- National Register of Historic Places listings in North Dakota
