= Liberty Baptist Church =

Liberty Baptist Church may refer to:

- Liberty Baptist Church (Grooverville, Georgia), listed on the National Register of Historic Places in Brooks County, Georgia
- Liberty Baptist Church (Evansville, Indiana), listed on the National Register of Historic Places in Vanderburgh County, Indiana
- Liberty Baptist Church (Kief, North Dakota), listed on the National Register of Historic Places in McHenry County, North Dakota
