= Sevareid =

Sevareid is a surname. Notable people with the surname include:

- Alfred and Clara Sevareid, former owners of the Alfred and Clara Sevareid House, registered in the American National Register of Historic Places
- Eric Sevareid (1912–1992), American journalist
