= Hudson Bay Girls =

The Hudson Bay Girls are a group of four young women who canoed from Lake Superior in Minnesota to Hudson Bay in Manitoba in summer 2025. They are believed to be the first publicly documented all-women group to complete this route.

The group consists of four young women who all worked as canoe guides previously. Their names are: Olivia Bledsoe, Emma Brackett, Abby Cichocki, and Helena Karlstrom.

The trip was inspired by Natalie Warren and Ann Raiho's trip in 2011 from Minneapolis to the Hudson Bay, described in the 2021 book Hudson Bay Bound. They were, in turn, inspired by Eric Sevareid's 1935 book Canoeing with the Cree.

== Route ==
The Hudson Bay Girls started their journey at Lake Superior in Minnesota. They followed the Grand Portage, an 8.5 mile portage trail. They paddled through the Boundary Waters and Voyageurs National Park in Minnesota. They followed the Rainy River along the US-Canada border to Lake of the Woods. After crossing into Canada, they followed the Winnipeg River to Lake Winnipeg. Finally, they followed the Hayes River north to York Factory on Hudson Bay.

The group followed historic fur trade routes.

== Advocacy ==
The Hudson Bay Girls used their platform to encourage conservation and inclusion, partnering with Save The Boundary Waters. The group also donated funds to the Northern Lakes Canoe Base Alumni Association (NLCBAA), near Ely, MN, which provides wilderness trip opportunities to Girl Scouts.
