= Canoe camping =

Combination of canoeing and camping

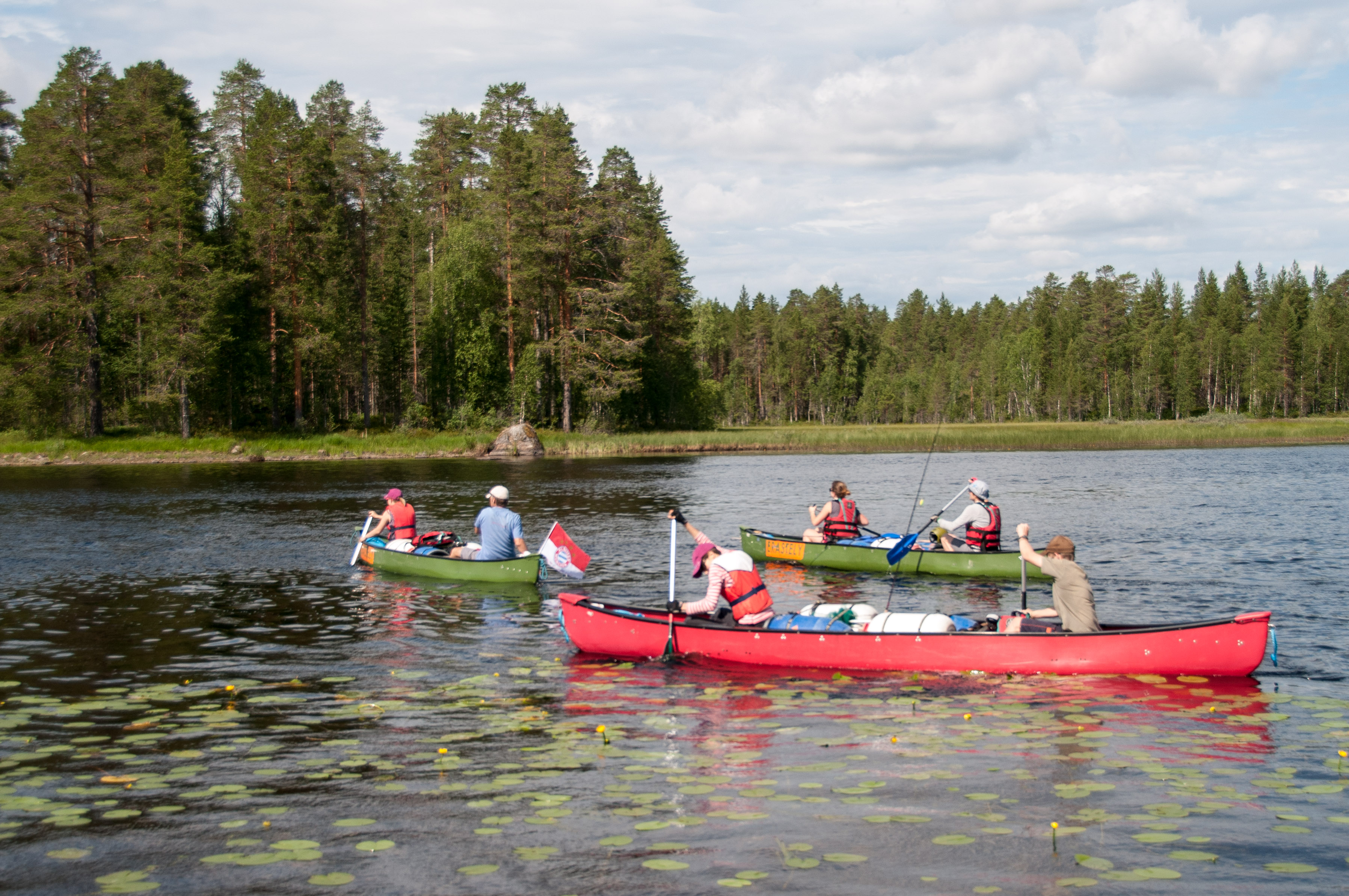
People canoeing at Lake Kokkojärvi in Lieksa, Finland

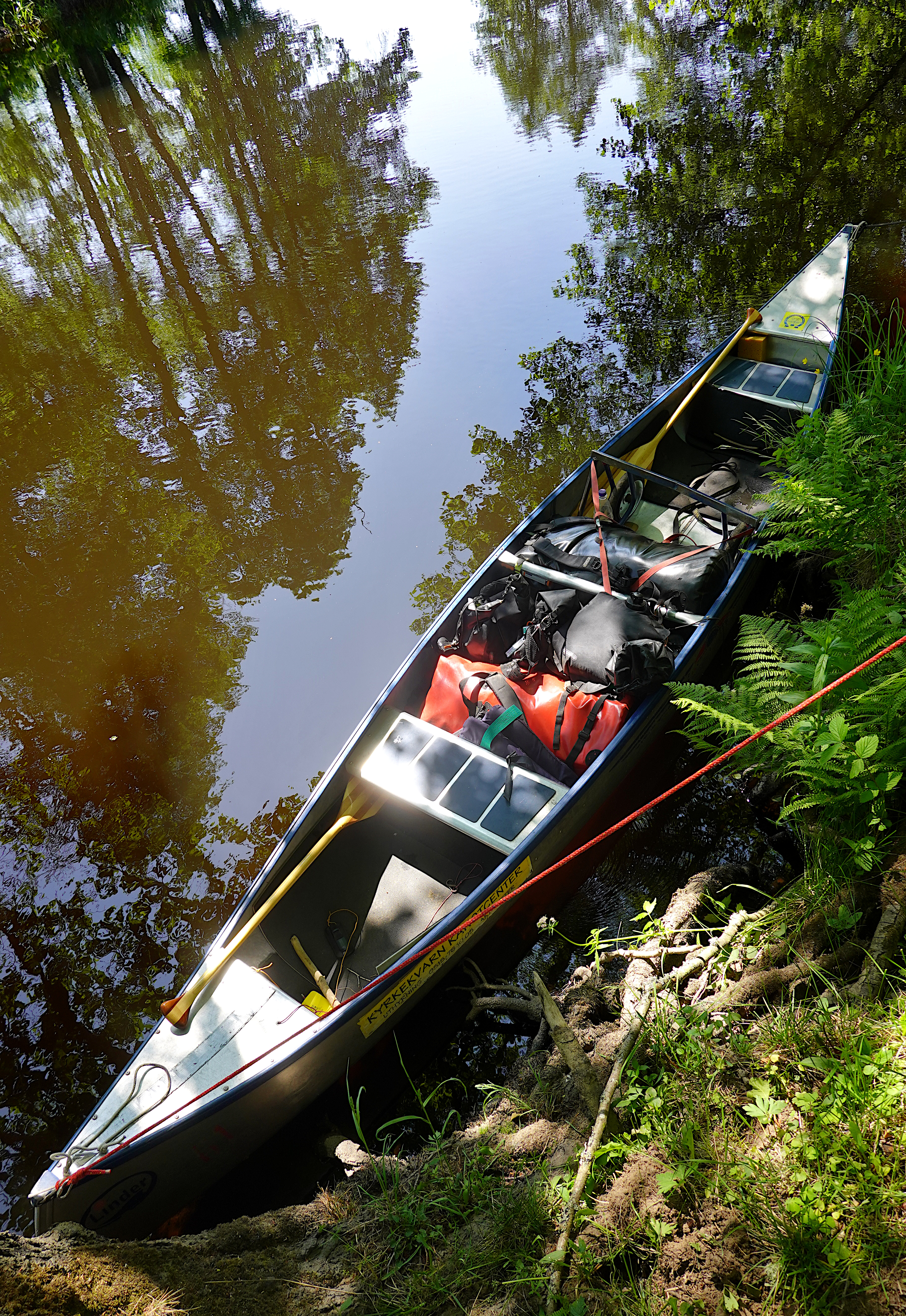
Loaded aluminium canoe on the Tidan River, Sweden

Canoe camping, also known as touring, tripping or expedition canoeing, is a combination of canoeing and camping. Canoe campers typically carry enough supplies with them to travel and camp for several days via a canoe.

== Description ==
A canoeist can transport significantly heavier and bulkier loads than a backpacker or even a kayaker can. Portaging by foot is sometimes necessary to pass between water bodies or around hazardous obstacles such as rapids or waterfalls, but most of the time canoe campers travel on water. Because they usually don't continuously carry their gear on their backs, canoe campers can bring more food and gear and undertake longer trips. This is especially the case with food which, unlike gear where the weight is essentially fixed regardless of the trip duration, increases in weight for each additional day of provision. On rivers, high water levels after storms can make river travel hazardous, while on lakes, winds and thunderstorms can produce strong winds which create large waves and headwinds which work against paddlers to slow the canoe. Trips may need to have extra days built into the schedule in case of weather delays.

Although some experienced canoeists feel comfortable paddling straight through large bodies of water, most typically stay within a few hundred meters of shore. Since a fully loaded touring canoe only draws about 14 centimetres (5.5 in), it can approach a rocky shore as close as arm's-length. This proximity (and a canoe's inherent quietness) lets the canoeist observe aquatic and near-shore plants and wildlife from a perspective that walking on solid ground does not allow. Many people engage in fishing while canoe camping.

The versatility of canoe tripping allows canoeists to go places and see things that they otherwise could not.

Many canoeists use specialized canoe packs designed for both easy portaging and loading into canoes. Waterproof dry bags are frequently used to keep important items dry in case of inclement weather or capsizing.

== History ==
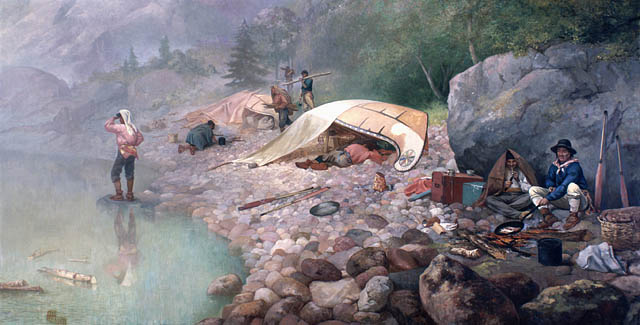
Voyageurs at Dawn by F.A. Hopkins (1871) - during their trips, expedition canoe travel was a way of life for French voyageurs. This painting well shows the rudimentary camping practices of the voyageurs.

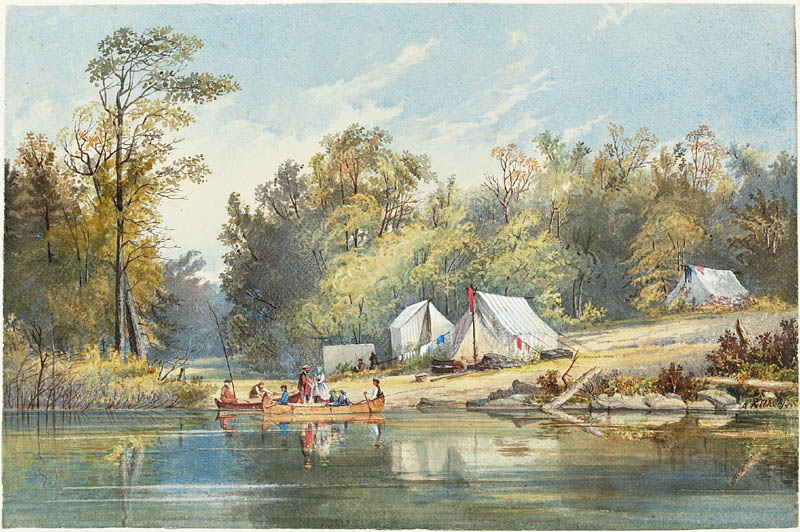
A Tenting Party, by Alicia Killaly, c. 1860.

Native Americans of many different tribes who used canoes for transportation, needed to "canoe camp" regularly. Before the construction of modern means of transportation and transportation routes, the most effective way to travel through the vast expanses of northern wilderness was to navigate the countless small waterways by canoe. Their canoe was perfect for this purpose, as it was relatively easy to carry, fast, able to traverse a wide variety of different water ways (small streams to huge lakes), and able to carry large loads.

It was for all these reasons that the early French explorers of North America, such as Louis Jolliet, quickly adopted the use of the Native American canoe. With them came Jesuit missionaries, coureurs des bois, and voyageurs. Once trading posts were established in the interior, the canoe continued to be the primary transportation method, supplying such posts with regular canoe brigades. In northern Quebec, this practice continued until the middle of the 20th century.

As the "wilderness" of the Americas was tamed by the construction of the railroad and later roads, the canoe as a means of primary transportation lost its practicality. It turned into a recreational sport, a way for Americans and others to experience the pre-European America, and have a glimpse of a formerly never-ending wilderness. While recreational canoe camping has been enjoyed since the late 19th century by sporting and boating enthusiasts, it was not until later in the 20th century that, with the advent of camping consumer goods, it gained mass appeal.

== Notable proponents and expeditions ==
=== 1800s ===
An early proponent and popularizer of canoe camping was George W. Sears, a sportswriter for Forest and Stream magazine in the 1880s, whose book Woodcraft (1884), told the story of his 1883, 266-mile (428 km) journey through the central Adirondacks in a 9-foot-long (2.7 m), 10 1/2-pound (4.8 kg) solo canoe named the Sairy Gamp. He was 64 years old and in frail health at the time.

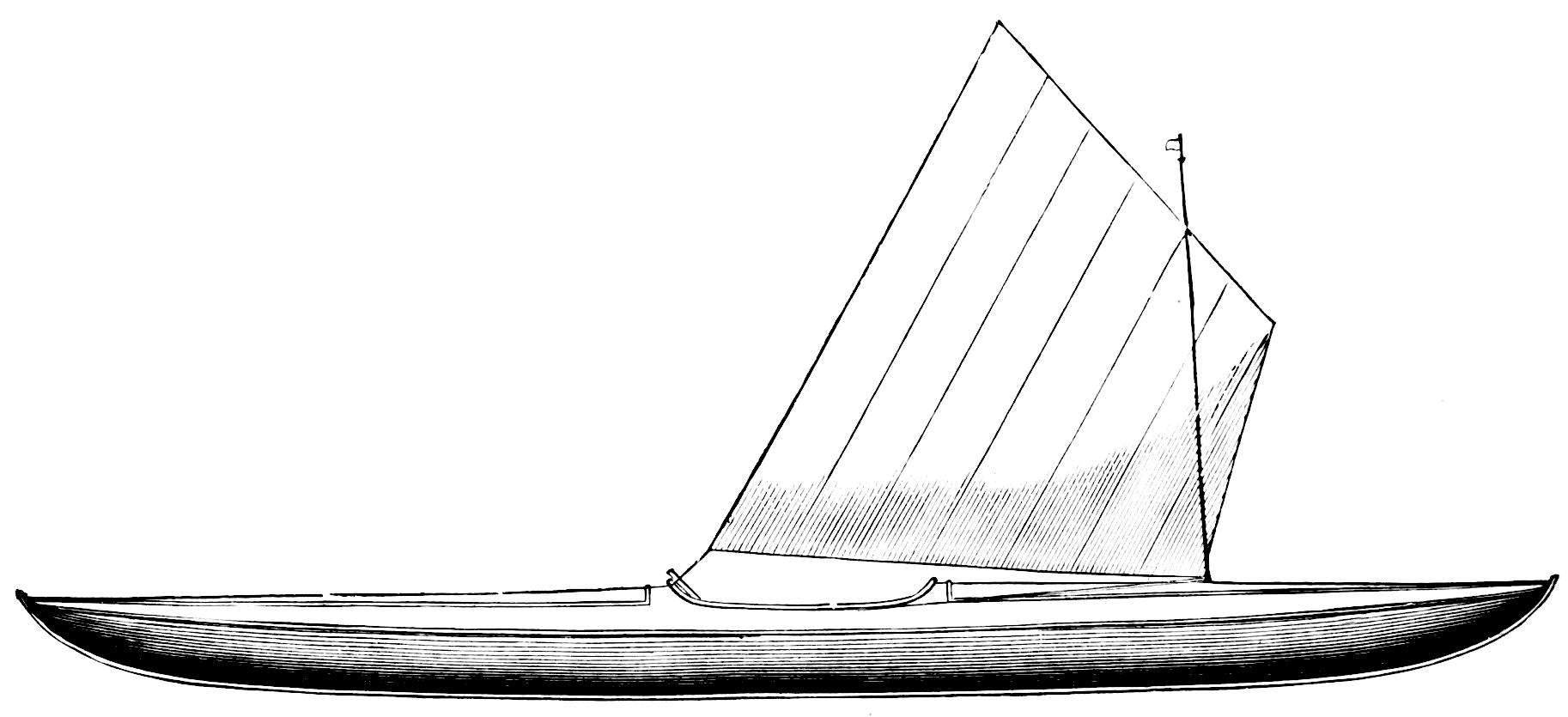
The Rob Roy canoe

John MacGregor during the 1860s built and sailed and paddled his "Rob Roy" canoes through Europe, and the Middle East documenting these in a series of books including;; (1886) A Thousand Miles in the Rob Roy Canoe; (1867) The Voyage Alone In The Yawl 'Rob Roy'; (1867) The Rob Roy on the Baltic; and (1869) The Rob Roy on the Jordan, Nile, Red sea. Inspired by MacGregor, and using a version of his "Rob Roy" canoe Robert Louis Stevenson undertook, in 1876, a canoe journey through the waterways of France and Belgium and wrote this up in his An Inland Voyage.

Also in 1883, American Canoe Association Secretary Charles Neide and retired sea captain "Barnacle" Kendall paddled and sailed over 3,000 miles (4,800 km) in a sailing canoe from Lake George, New York to Pensacola, Florida.

Henry David Thoreau, an American author and advocate of environmental conservation, provided a written account of a long distance canoeing expedition in his book The Maine Woods. Thoreau's canoeing expedition in Maine covered remote areas that can still be experienced in Maine's Hundred Mile Wilderness.

=== 1900s ===
The adventure memoir Canoeing with the Cree relates Eric Sevareid's youthful journey with a companion from Minnesota to Hudson Bay in 1930.

The book New York to Nome by Rick Steber details the story of Sheldon Taylor and Geoffrey Pope who paddled from New York City April 25, 1936, to Nome, Alaska, August 11, 1937.

In Canada, Bill Mason, who was an author, artist, filmmaker, and environmentalist, published several books and produced a number of films in the 1970s that greatly advanced the popularity of canoe camping.

Calvin Rutstrum was a wilderness canoeist and author, whom Bill Mason said "totally influenced me" and "he became my hero".

Like Mason and Sevareid, a number of modern-day canoeists have retraced the historic routes of the fur-traders and voyageurs and published books about their experiences. Noteworthy examples from Canada include Coke Stop in Emo: Adventures of a Long-Distance Paddler by Alec Ross, Canoeing a Continent: On the Trail of Alexander MacKenzie by Max Finkelstein and Where Rivers Run by Joanie and Gary McGuffin.

Sigurd Olson, conservationist and north woods writer, traveled and camped by canoe extensively. These included long trips as he wrote about in his book The Lonely Land and well as frequent shorter trips covered in many of his books.

Eric W. Morse, author, historian and notable wilderness canoe tripper traveled with Sigurd Olson. He authored books on their wilderness trips and on historical fur trade canoe routes in Canada.

From January 10, 1975 until November 12, 1977, Jerry Robert Pushcar canoed and portaged solo a distance of 14,290 kilometres (8,880 mi) from New Orleans, Louisiana, to Nome, Alaska, via the Mississippi, Prescott, Minnesota, Grand Portage, Lake Superior, and Canada. This was the longest recorded canoe trip in history until 1980.

The canoe trip record set by Jerry Robert Pushcar was broken by Don Starkell and his sons Dana and Jeff, who paddled in an open canoe from Winnipeg in central Canada to Belém at the mouth of the Amazon River from June 1, 1980 to May 1, 1982, covering a distance of 19,603 kilometres (12,181 mi).

=== 2000s ===
In the "Source to Sea expedition" of 2005, two students from North Carolina State University paddled 2,150 miles (3,460 km) down the Mississippi and Atchafalaya Rivers to support the Audubon Society's Upper Mississippi River Campaign.

In 2025, the Hudson Bay Girls, a group of 4 young women, paddled 1,300 miles from Lake Superior to Hudson Bay, following historic fur trade routes.
