= Granville State Bank =

- U.S. National Register of Historic Places
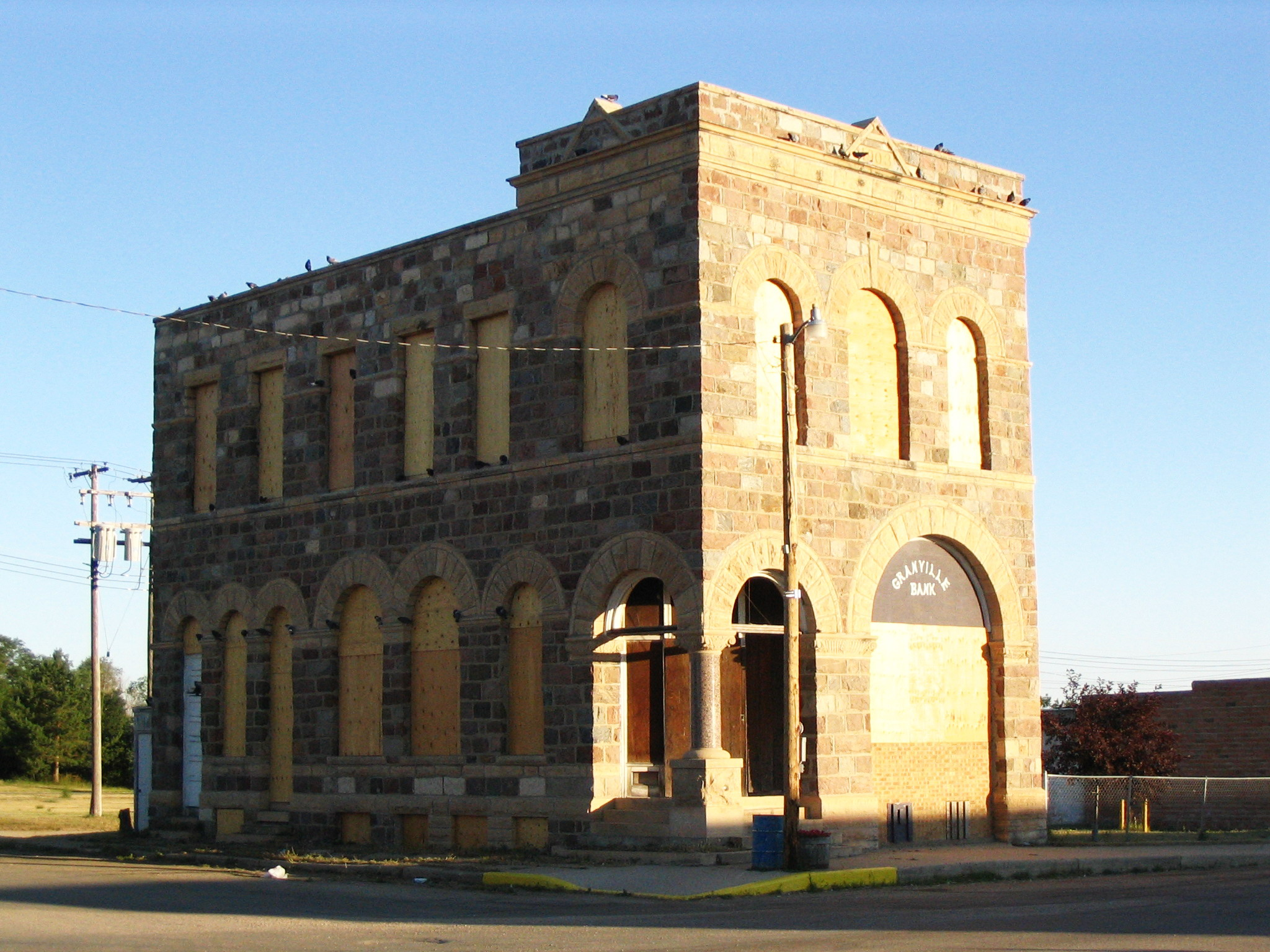

- Location within North Dakota Location within the United States
- Location: Main and 2nd Sts., Granville, North Dakota
- Coordinates: 48°16′2″N 100°50′3″W
- Area: less than one acre
- Built: 1903
- Built by: Bill Horton; Robert Fowler
- Architect: James S. Cox
- Architectural style: Richardsonian Romanesque
- NRHP reference No.: 77001509
- Added to NRHP: September 13, 1977

The Granville State Bank, also known as the Former Granville Service Agency, is a two-story commercial building on Main Street in Granville, North Dakota. The structure was built by Granville State Bank president George E. Stubbins in 1903 using sandstone and prairie granite from Kottke Valley Township to the northwest. The architect was James S. Cox of Estherville, Iowa, who also designed the Grand Auditorium and Hotel Block in Story City, Iowa.

The building was listed on the National Register of Historic Places (NRHP) in 1977. It served as the headquarters for the state banking board's examiners and receivers until 1929. It was occupied by the Granville State Bank from 1929 until the time of the bank's liquidation in 1941. An International Harvester dealership also did business in the building.

The bank had "ornate wooden fixtures" which were transferred in 1973 to a bank museum within what was the First Bank of Crosby, at Divide County Pioneer Village in Crosby, North Dakota.
