= Land Township =

Land Township may refer to the following townships in the United States:

- Land Township, Grant County, Minnesota
- Land Township, McHenry County, North Dakota
