= Kief (disambiguation) =

Kief may refer to:

- Kief or cannabis crystals, the resinous trichomes of cannabis.
- Kief, North Dakota, a city in the United States.
- An alternate name for Kyiv (Kiev), the capital of Ukraine.
