= Norway Lutheran Church and Cemetery =

Historic site in McHenry County, North Dakota, US

- U.S. National Register of Historic Places
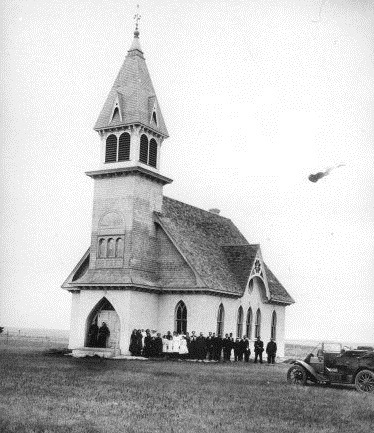
- Norway Lutheran Church in 1912

- Location within North Dakota Location within the United States
- Interactive map of Norway Lutheran Church and Cemetery
- Nearest city: Denbigh, North Dakota
- Coordinates: 48°10′53″N 100°36′53″W
- Area: 4.4 acres (1.8 ha)
- Built: 1907
- Architectural style: Late Gothic Revival
- NRHP reference No.: 94001216
- Added to NRHP: October 14, 1994

The Norway Lutheran Church and Cemetery was located 10 miles from south of Denbigh, North Dakota and were listed on the National Register of Historic Places (NRHP) in 1994. The NRHP listing includes the main church structure, a cemetery, and two contributing privies to the west and rear of the church, all situated on a 4.4 acres (1.8 ha) site. A pyramid-shaped monument topped with an iron cross is located at the northeast corner of the cemetery and marks site of an older log church. Norwegian skier Sondre Norheim was buried in the cemetery in 1897.

The church was built in 1907 with sand bricks from the Denbigh Brick Plant. The church was designed in a Late Gothic Revival style with a bell tower that reaches a height of 65 feet from the foundation. It was built on a hill above the Souris River and is visible for miles.

The inclusion of the site on the NRHP was based on its historic integrity, its being "one of the best and well-maintained examples of a rural church" on the North Dakota prairie, and the use of bricks rather than wood in the construction of the church.
