= Lake Souris =

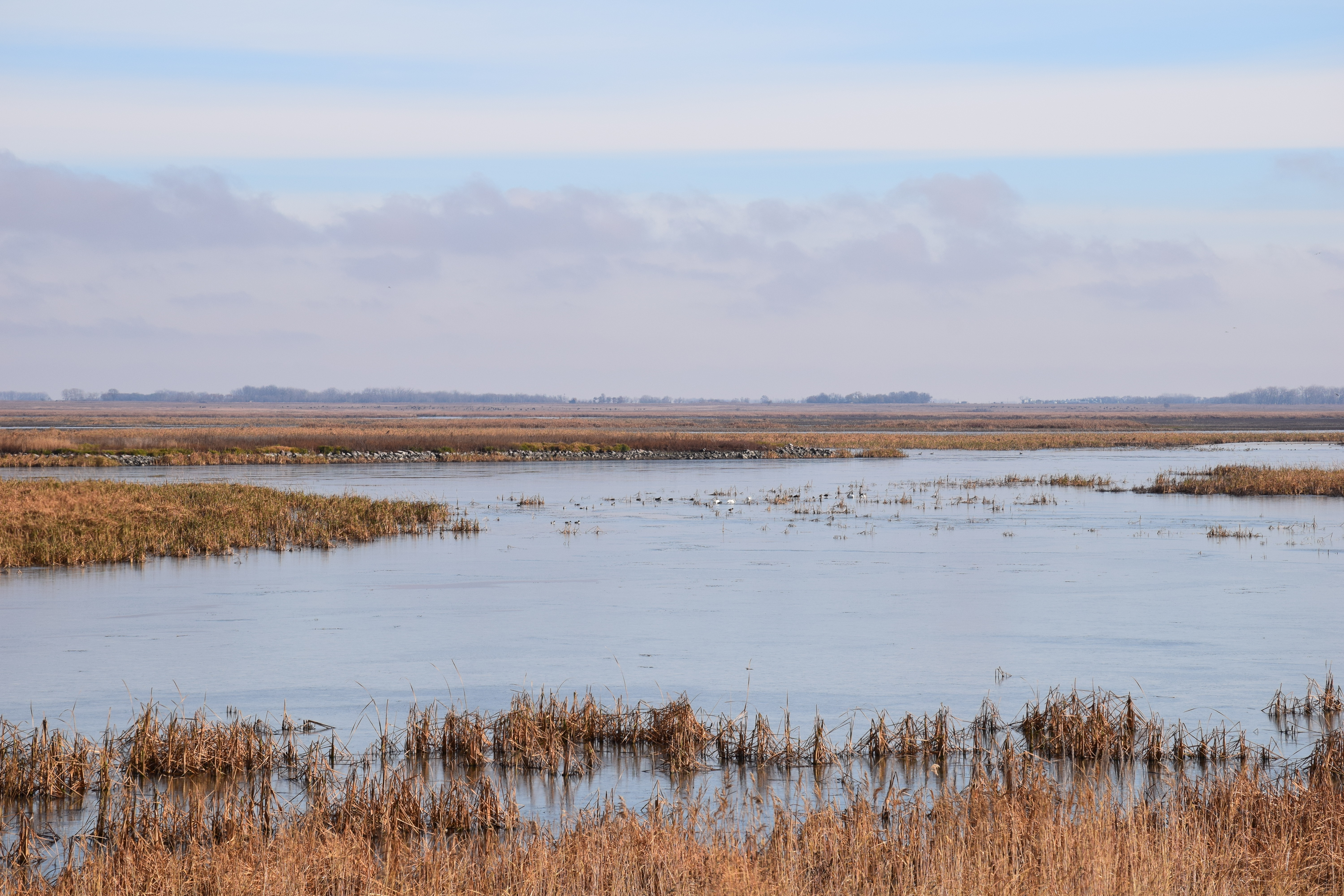
- A few ducks and swans rest in the marsh at J. Clark Salyer NWR.

- Location within North Dakota
- Location: Souris River
- Coordinates: 48.52°N 100.47°W
- Lake type: former lake
- Basin countries: Canada; United States
- Max. length: 170 mi (270 km)
- Max. width: 70 mi (110 km)
- Surface elevation: 1,600 ft (488 m)
- References: Lemke, Richard Walter; Preliminary geologic map showing boundaries of glacial Lake Souris, North Dakota; Report 52-02; U.S. Geological Survey; Reston, VA; 1952; doi:10.3133/ofr5292

The Glacial Lake Souris occupied the basin of the Souris River from the most southern portion of this river's loop in North Dakota to its elbow in Manitoba, where it turned sharply northward and passed through the Tiger Hills. The length of Lake Souris was about 170 miles, from latitude 48° to latitude 50°35', and its maximum width, north of Turtle Mountain, was nearly 70 miles. It was situated near the far southeast corner of the large glacial Lake Agassiz, separated from it by another small glacial body, Glacial Lake Hind.

North of the Souris basin, an arm of this lake extended along the Assiniboine River from Griswold and Oak Lake to some distance above the mouth of the Qu'Appelle River in Saskatchewan; and the main body of the lake was deeply indented on the east by the high oval area of Turtle Mountain, and forms, with overlying drift deposits, the massive terrace of the Missouri Coteau on the west.

The mouth of Lake Souris, where it first outflowed to Lake Agassiz by the Big Coulée River and the Sheyenne River, was approximately 1,600 to 1,500 feet above the present sea-level, being gradually cut down about 100 feet by the stream. Because of subsequent changes which are known to have taken place in the relative elevation of the land and water surfaces in this district, the shore-line of the northern part of the lake at the end of its time of outflow to the Sheyenne would now have an elevation of about 1,600 feet at Langs Valley. Therefore, when its channel of discharge was transferred to the new course by Pelican Lake and along the Pembina River, Lake Souris was suddenly lowered about 125 feet to the level of the top of the bluffs of Langs Valley, and a further lowering of 110 feet was afterward affected by the gradual erosion of this valley. The lake was wholly drained by this outlet.

== The "North Dakota Gold Rush" and Lake Souris ==
Since the early 1900s, gold has also been known to occur in the sand and gravel deposits associated with glacial Lake Souris in McHenry County, Bottineau County, and Pierce County in North Dakota. The first discovery of gold there likely dates to May, 1908, when mining claims were recorded about three miles east of the town of Denbigh in McHenry County.

Later in 1908, the Eldorado Gold Mining Company was organized to "cooperate and purchase a dredge or mining boat of sufficient capacity to do the work in the best possible manner." Several other similar companies were formed at about the same time. However, the search for gold was ultimately fruitless, and the companies soon closed and exited the region.

The gold-bearing deposits associated with the glacial Lake Souris sediments in McHenry County were "rediscovered" in 1931 when reports from Chicago claimed that gold nuggets had been taken from the crops of turkeys grown near Denbigh. Individuals and organizations filed placer claims and took mining leases until virtually all of the ground over a large area surrounding Denbigh and Towner was covered.

The gold contained in the Lake Souris gravel deposits was apparently derived from rocks of the Canadian Shield to the north. The glaciers that transported the gold to north-central North Dakota flowed over what are today the Gods Lake, Flin Flon, and Lac La Ronge mining districts of northern Manitoba and Saskatchewan. This part of the Canadian Shield is situated about 500 miles (800 km) straight north of the Denbigh area and, based on flow directions believed to have occurred during the glacial ice, it is in a likely position to serve as a source for the gold. After glacial sediments were dropped by melting ice, they were washed by streams of meltwater, which helped to concentrate the gold by removing the lighter weight material. Gold-bearing sediments were deposited on the floor of Lake Souris as undercurrent fans at the mouths of the Souris and other rivers.
