= Eastwood Park Bridge =

- U.S. National Register of Historic Places
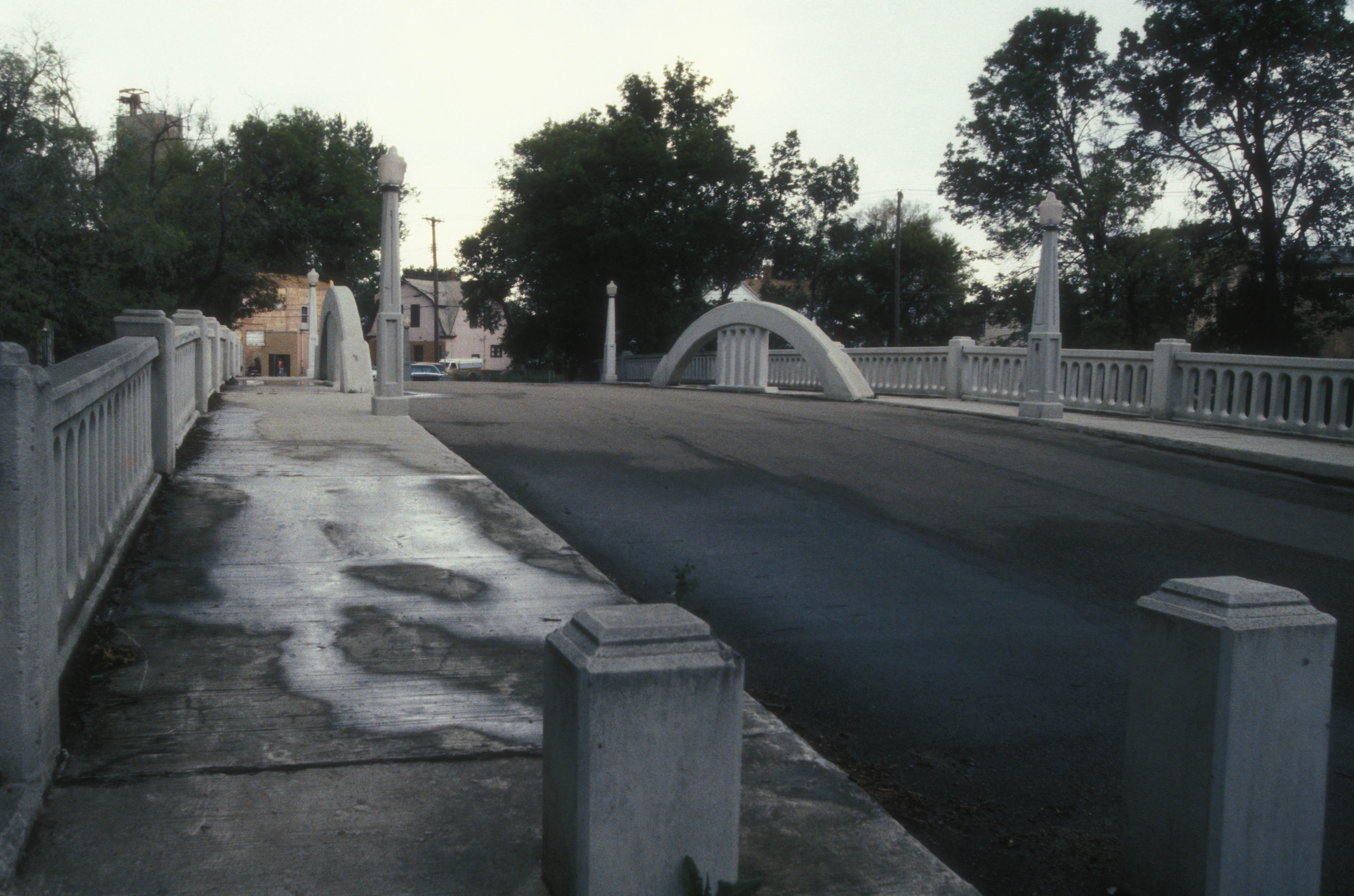

- Location within North Dakota Location within the United States
- Location: Central Ave. and 6th St., SE, Minot, North Dakota
- Coordinates: 48°14′10″N 101°17′3″W
- Area: 0.2 acres (0.081 ha)
- Built: 1927
- Built by: Dakota Concrete Company; T.W. Sprauge; Kenneth Haas
- Architectural style: False arch
- NRHP reference No.: 75001307
- Added to NRHP: April 21, 1975

The Eastwood Park Bridge in Minot, North Dakota is a false arch structure that was built in 1927. It was listed on the National Register of Historic Places in 1975.

It spans an oxbow of the Souris River.

== See also ==
- Elliott Bridge: NRHP-listed Souris River crossing in McHenry County, North Dakota
- Westgaard Bridge: NRHP listed Souris River crossing in McHenry County, North Dakota
