= Grand Auditorium and Hotel Block =

- U.S. National Register of Historic Places
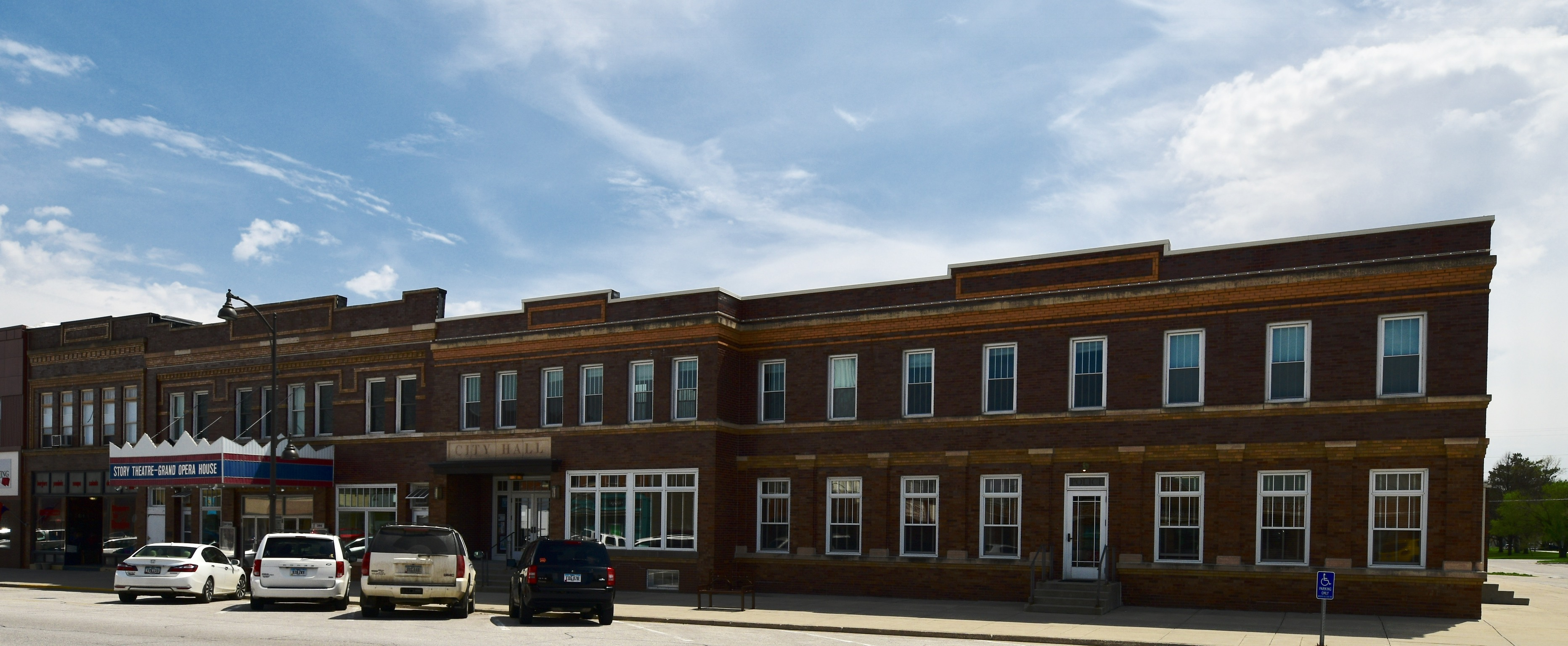

- Location within Iowa Location within the United States
- Location: Broad St. Story City, Iowa
- Coordinates: 42°11′12.5″N 93°35′49.7″W
- Area: 1 acre (0.40 ha)
- Built: 1913
- Architect: James S. Cox
- NRHP reference No.: 80001460
- Added to NRHP: January 25, 1980

The Grand Auditorium and Hotel Block is a group of four adjoining historic commercial buildings located in Story City, Iowa, United States. On the eastern side, buildings one and three housed various commercial establishments over the years. Building two housed the Grand Opera House, now known as the Story Theatre/Grand Opera House. It has been used for both live theater productions and movies. The fourth building housed the Grand Hotel. The Grand Hotel and Auditorium Company was organized from Story City's Commercial Club in 1913. They hired Estherville, Iowa architect James S. Cox to design the complex, which was completed in December 1913. While each facade is unique, all four buildings share common elements. Their commonalities include two stories in height, red-brick exterior walls ornamented with buff brick and concrete details. The first three buildings share the same wall plane, while the hotel is slightly recessed from the others. The buildings also decrease in scale from east to west. This slight variation is due to differing treatments of the cornices and parapets. The buildings were listed on the National Register of Historic Places in 1980.
