= Westgaard Bridge =

- U.S. National Register of Historic Places
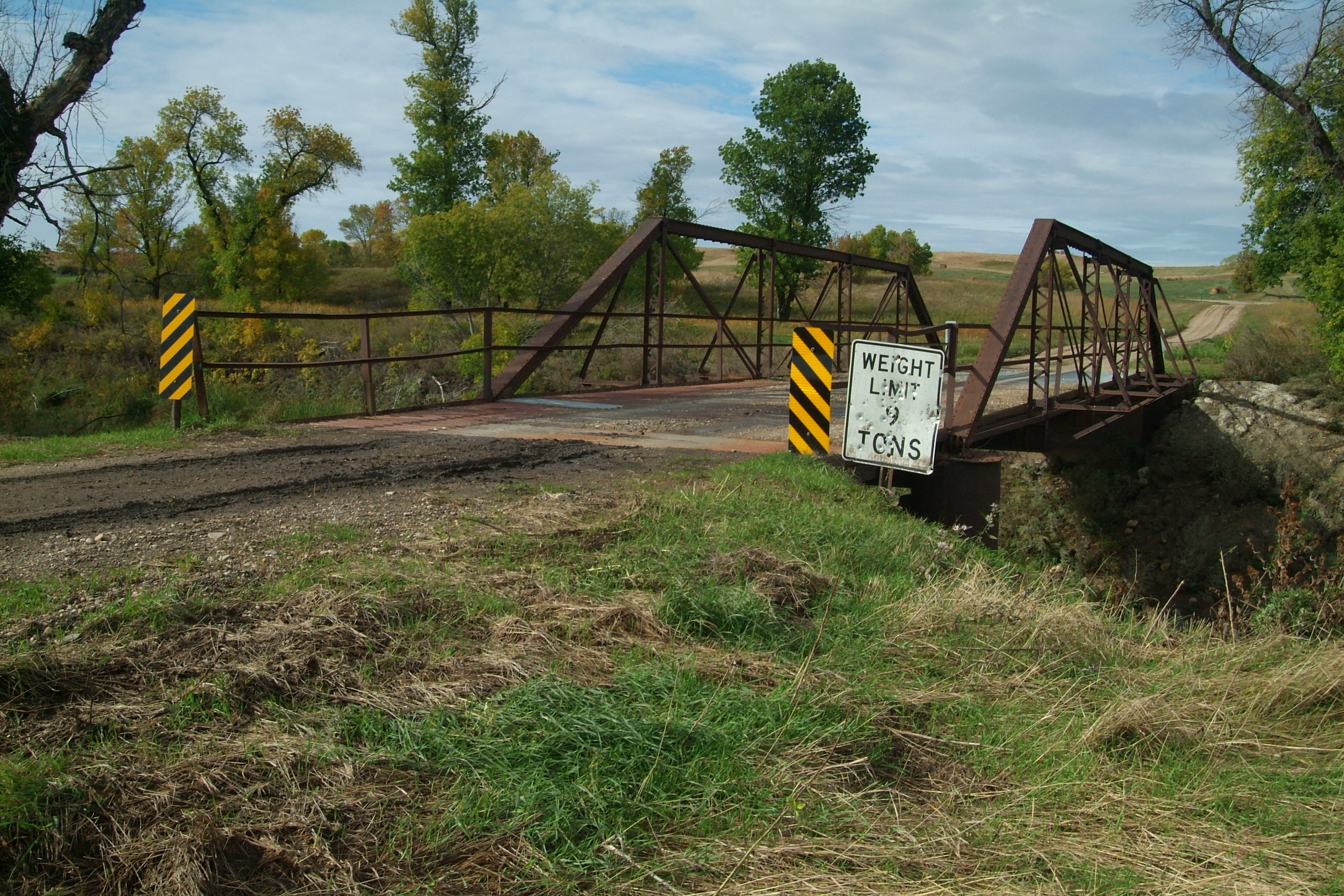

- Location within North Dakota Location within the United States
- Nearest city: Voltaire, North Dakota
- Coordinates: 48°6′51″N 100°48′33″W
- Area: less than one acre
- Built: 1902
- Built by: Fargo Bridge & Iron Co.
- Architectural style: Pratt pony through truss
- MPS: Historic Roadway Bridges of North Dakota MPS
- NRHP reference No.: 97000180
- Added to NRHP: February 27, 1997

The Westgaard Bridge, also known as Souris River Bridge, near Voltaire, North Dakota is a Pratt pony truss through structure that was built in 1902 to cross the Souris River. It was listed on the National Register of Historic Places in 1997.

It is the oldest documented bridge in McHenry County.

== See also ==
- Eastwood Park Bridge: NRHP-listed Souris River crossing in Minot, North Dakota
- Elliott Bridge: NRHP-listed Souris River crossing also in McHenry County, North Dakota
