= Divide County Museum =

Museum in Crosby, North Dakota, US

Coordinates: 48.914870°N 103.294803°W

The Divide County Museum, which has also been known as the Divide County Pioneer Village, is a museum and local heritage center located in Crosby, North Dakota. The site includes approximately 25 restored historical buildings, including two churches, a schoolhouse, print shop, general store, sawmill, blacksmith shop, baker, and the former First Bank of Crosby. Dedicated in 1979, the museum is operated by the Divide County Historical Society and has held threshing shows at the site.
