= Kief, North Dakota =

- City
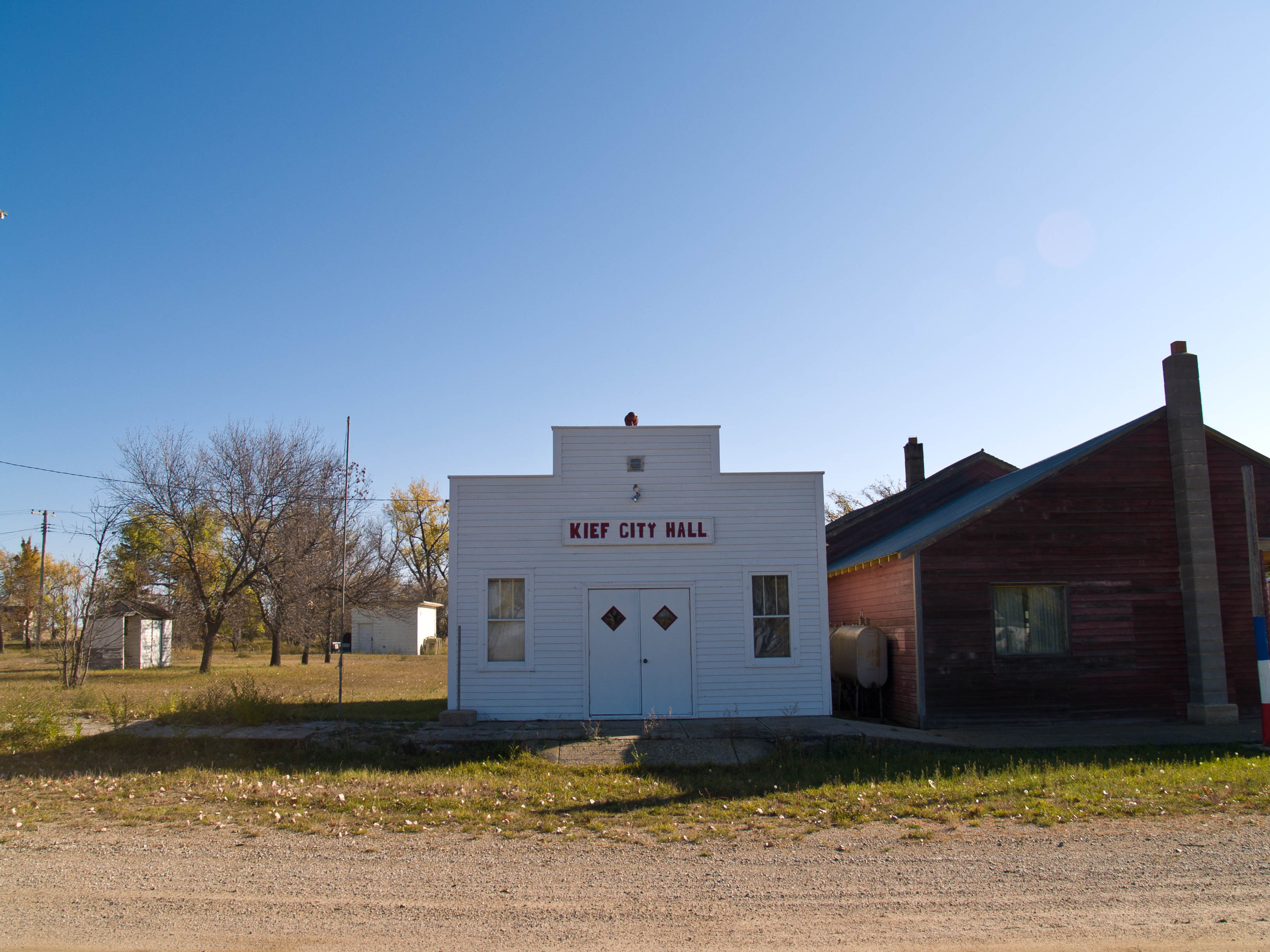
- Kief City Hall as seen in 2008

- Location of Kief, North Dakota
- Coordinates: 47°51′36″N 100°30′48″W
- Country: United States
- State: North Dakota
- County: McHenry
- Founded: 1908
- Incorporated (village): 1916
- Incorporated (city): 1967
- Named for: Kiev, Russian Empire

Area
  - Total: 1.25 sq mi (3.23 km^{2})
  - Land: 1.23 sq mi (3.18 km^{2})
  - Water: 0.023 sq mi (0.06 km^{2})
- Elevation: 1,670 ft (510 m)

Population (2020)
  - Total: 8
  - Estimate (2024): 8
  - Density: 6.5/sq mi (2.52/km^{2})
- Time zone: UTC–6 (Central (CST))
  - Summer (DST): UTC–5 (CDT)
- ZIP Code: 58723
- Area code: 701
- FIPS code: 38-42660
- GNIS feature ID: 1036106

Kief is a city in McHenry County, North Dakota, United States. The population was 8 at the 2020 census. It is part of the Minot Micropolitan Statistical Area. Kief was founded in 1908.

== History ==
Kief was founded in 1908 as a station along the Soo Line Railroad. The city was named by Black Sea German settlers after the city of Kiev in the Russian Empire (present-day Kyiv, Ukraine). (Note: Kief was the common spelling at the time.) A post office was established in 1909 and the town was later incorporated as a village in 1916. It achieved a peak population of 307 in 1920. It became a city in 1967, after the North Dakota Legislature enacted legislation that eliminated all existing incorporation titles for towns and villages in the state.

== Geography ==
Kief is located in Land Township, roughly 8 miles (13 km) southwest of Drake.

According to the United States Census Bureau, the city has a total area of 1.25 square miles (3.24 km^{2}), of which 1.23 square miles (3.19 km^{2}) is land and 0.02 square miles (0.05 km^{2}) is water.

== Demographics ==
Historical population
| Census | Pop. | Note | %± |
|---|---|---|---|
| 1920 | 307 | | — |
| 1930 | 139 | | −54.7% |
| 1940 | 159 | | 14.4% |
| 1950 | 135 | | −15.1% |
| 1960 | 97 | | −28.1% |
| 1970 | 46 | | −52.6% |
| 1980 | 36 | | −21.7% |
| 1990 | 24 | | −33.3% |
| 2000 | 13 | | −45.8% |
| 2010 | 13 | | 0.0% |
| 2020 | 8 | | −38.5% |
| 2024 (est.) | 8 | | 0.0% |
U.S. Decennial Census; 2020 Census

=== 2010 census ===
As of the 2010 census, there were 13 people, 8 households, and 4 families residing in the city. The population density was 10.7 inhabitants per square mile (4.1/km^{2}). There were 12 housing units at an average density of 9.8 per square mile (3.8/km^{2}). The racial makeup of the city was 100.0% White.

There were 8 households, of which 12.5% had children under the age of 18 living with them, 25.0% were married couples living together, 25.0% had a male householder with no wife present, and 50.0% were non-families. 50.0% of all households were made up of individuals, and 25% had someone living alone who was 65 years of age or older. The average household size was 1.63 and the average family size was 2.25.

The median age in the city was 55.8 years. 7.7% of residents were under the age of 18; 0.0% were between the ages of 18 and 24; 0.0% were from 25 to 44; 69.3% were from 45 to 64; and 23.1% were 65 years of age or older. The gender makeup of the city was 53.8% male and 46.2% female.

=== 2000 census ===
As of the 2000 census, there were 13 people, 8 households, and 3 families residing in the city. The population density was 10.7 people per square mile (4.1/km^{2}). There were 18 housing units at an average density of 14.8 per square mile (5.7/km^{2}). Everyone was (by identity) White.

There were 8 households, out of which just 2 households (25.0%) had children under the age of 18 living with them, 12.5% were married couples living together, 12.5% had a female householder with no husband present, and 62.5% were non-families. 62.5% of all households were made up of individuals, and 37.5% had someone living alone who was 65 years of age or older. The average household size was 1.63 and the average family size was 2.67.

The largest population group in the city was 25 to 44 year olds, with 38.5%. Those aged 65 and over made up 30.8% of the population followed by those under the age of 18 with 23.1%. 45 to 64 year olds made up just 7.7% of the population. The median age was 42 years.

The median income for a household in the city was $6,875, and the median income for a family was $12,500. There were no year-round workers in the city, though 77.8% of the population reported earnings from Social Security income. When Social Security is excluded, 66.7% of the population reported some type of earnings. The per capita income for the city was $6,467. There were 50.0% of families living below the poverty line and 75.0% of the population. 100.0% of those over 64 were below the poverty line.

== See also ==
- Liberty Baptist Church (Kief, North Dakota): on the National Register of Historic Places
