= Granville, North Dakota =

- City
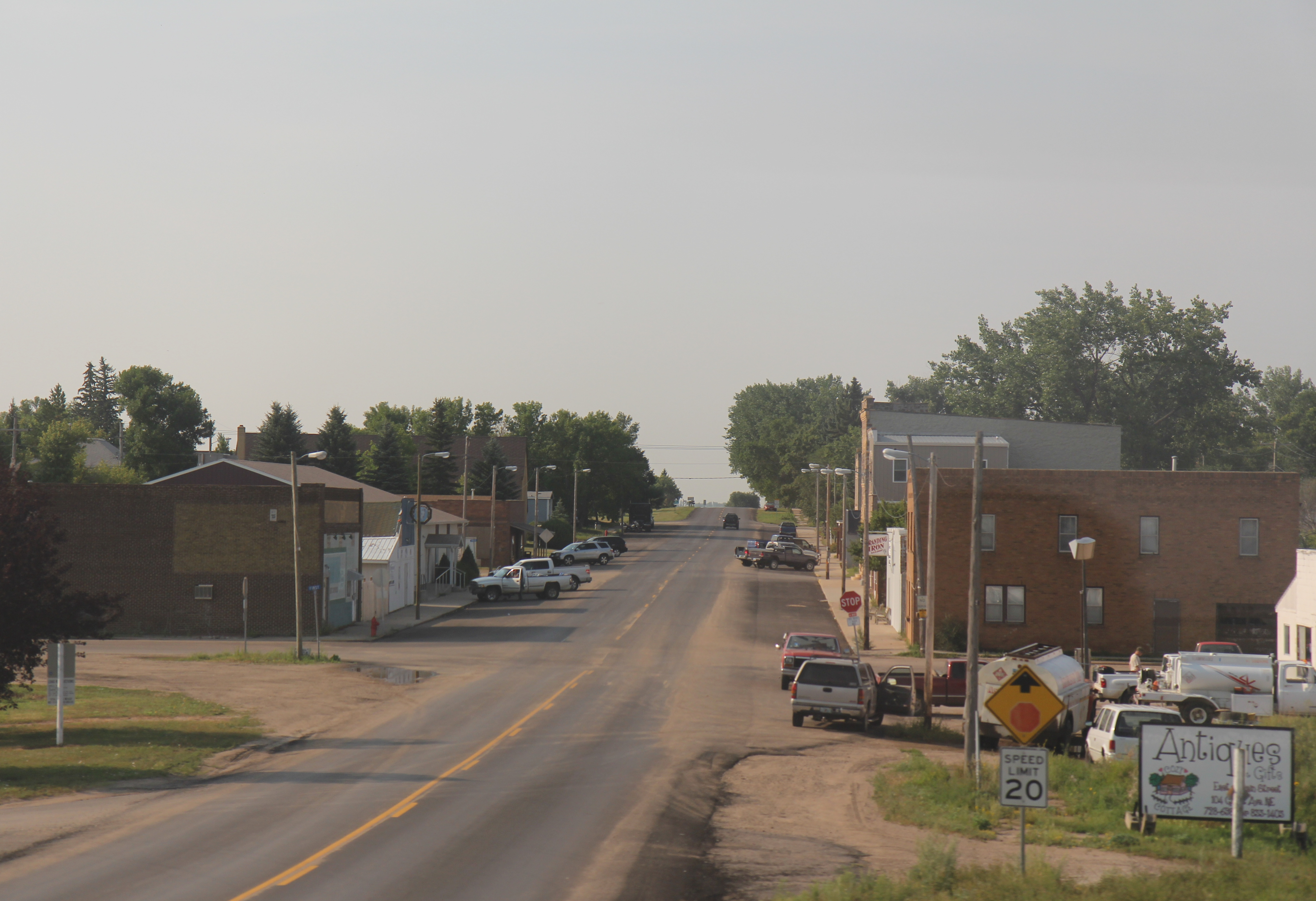
- Looking south in Granville

- Logo

- Location of Granville, North Dakota
- Coordinates: 48°16′0″N 100°50′36″W
- Country: United States
- State: North Dakota
- County: McHenry
- Founded: 1900
- Incorporated: 1906

Government
  - Mayor: Anthony Zimbelman

Area
  - Total: 0.32 sq mi (0.83 km^{2})
  - Land: 0.32 sq mi (0.82 km^{2})
  - Water: 0.0039 sq mi (0.01 km^{2})
- Elevation: 1,510 ft (460 m)

Population (2020)
  - Total: 240
  - Estimate (2022): 230
  - Density: 756.2/sq mi (291.98/km^{2})
- Time zone: UTC-6 (Central (CST))
  - Summer (DST): UTC-5 (CDT)
- ZIP code: 58741
- Area code: 701
- FIPS code: 38-32660
- GNIS feature ID: 1029218

Granville is a city in McHenry County, North Dakota, United States. The population was 240 at the 2020 census. It is part of the Minot Metropolitan Statistical Area. Granville was founded in 1900.

== History ==
Granville was laid out and platted in 1900. The city was named in honor of Granville M. Dodge, a railroad man. The railroad was extended to Granville in 1904, and the city was incorporated in 1906.

In the late 1990s, the town agreed to temporarily change its name to McGillicuddy City, in a promotion for Dr. McGillicuddy's schnapps.

== Geography ==
Granville is located at 48°16′0″N 100°50′36″W (48.266566, -100.843355).

According to the United States Census Bureau, the city has a total area of 0.28 square miles (0.73 km^{2}), all land.

== Demographics ==
Historical population
Census	Pop.	Note	%±
1910	455		—
1920	394		−13.4%
1930	450		14.2%
1940	443		−1.6%
1950	404		−8.8%
1960	400		−1.0%
1970	282		−29.5%
1980	281		−0.4%
1990	236		−16.0%
2000	286		21.2%
2010	241		−15.7%
2020	240		−0.4%
2022 (est.)	230		−4.2%
U.S. Decennial Census; 2020 Census

=== 2010 census ===
As of the census of 2010, there were 241 people, 109 households, and 65 families residing in the city. The population density was 860.7 inhabitants per square mile (332.3/km^{2}). There were 135 housing units at an average density of 482.1 per square mile (186.1/km^{2}). The racial makeup of the city was 97.1% White, 1.2% Native American, 0.4% Asian, and 1.2% from two or more races. Hispanic or Latino of any race were 3.3% of the population.

There were 109 households, of which 28.4% had children under the age of 18 living with them, 45.9% were married couples living together, 10.1% had a female householder with no husband present, 3.7% had a male householder with no wife present, and 40.4% were non-families. 37.6% of all households were made up of individuals, and 18.3% had someone living alone who was 65 years of age or older. The average household size was 2.21 and the average family size was 2.91.

The median age in the city was 44.3 years. 21.6% of residents were under the age of 18; 5.4% were between the ages of 18 and 24; 24.6% were from 25 to 44; 28.6% were from 45 to 64; and 19.9% were 65 years of age or older. The gender makeup of the city was 50.2% male and 49.8% female.

=== 2000 census ===
As of the census of 2000, there were 286 people, 120 households, and 77 families residing in the city. The population density was 1,042.5 inhabitants per square mile (402.5/km^{2}). There were 141 housing units at an average density of 514.0 per square mile (198.5/km^{2}). The racial makeup of the city was 96.50% White, 0.35% African American, 0.70% Native American, and 2.45% from two or more races.

There were 120 households, out of which 34.2% had children under the age of 18 living with them, 55.8% were married couples living together, 6.7% had a female householder with no husband present, and 35.8% were non-families. 30.0% of all households were made up of individuals, and 17.5% had someone living alone who was 65 years of age or older. The average household size was 2.38 and the average family size was 3.04.

In the city, the population was spread out, with 26.6% under the age of 18, 8.4% from 18 to 24, 24.5% from 25 to 44, 19.9% from 45 to 64, and 20.6% who were 65 years of age or older. The median age was 38 years. For every 100 females, there were 108.8 males. For every 100 females age 18 and over, there were 100.0 males.

The median income for a household in the city was $24,444, and the median income for a family was $28,500. Males had a median income of $27,500 versus $14,464 for females. The per capita income for the city was $14,576. About 7.5% of families and 9.9% of the population were below the poverty line, including 13.3% of those under the age of eighteen and 10.5% of those 65 or over.

== Climate ==
This climatic region is typified by large seasonal temperature differences, with warm to hot (and often humid) summers and cold (sometimes severely cold) winters. According to the Köppen Climate Classification system, Granville has a humid continental climate, abbreviated "Dfb" on climate maps.

Granville North Dakota holds 12 hour temperature rise record

In 12 hours: 83 °F, Granville, N.D., Feb. 21, 1918, from –33 °F to 50 °F from early morning to late afternoon.

== Historic Places ==
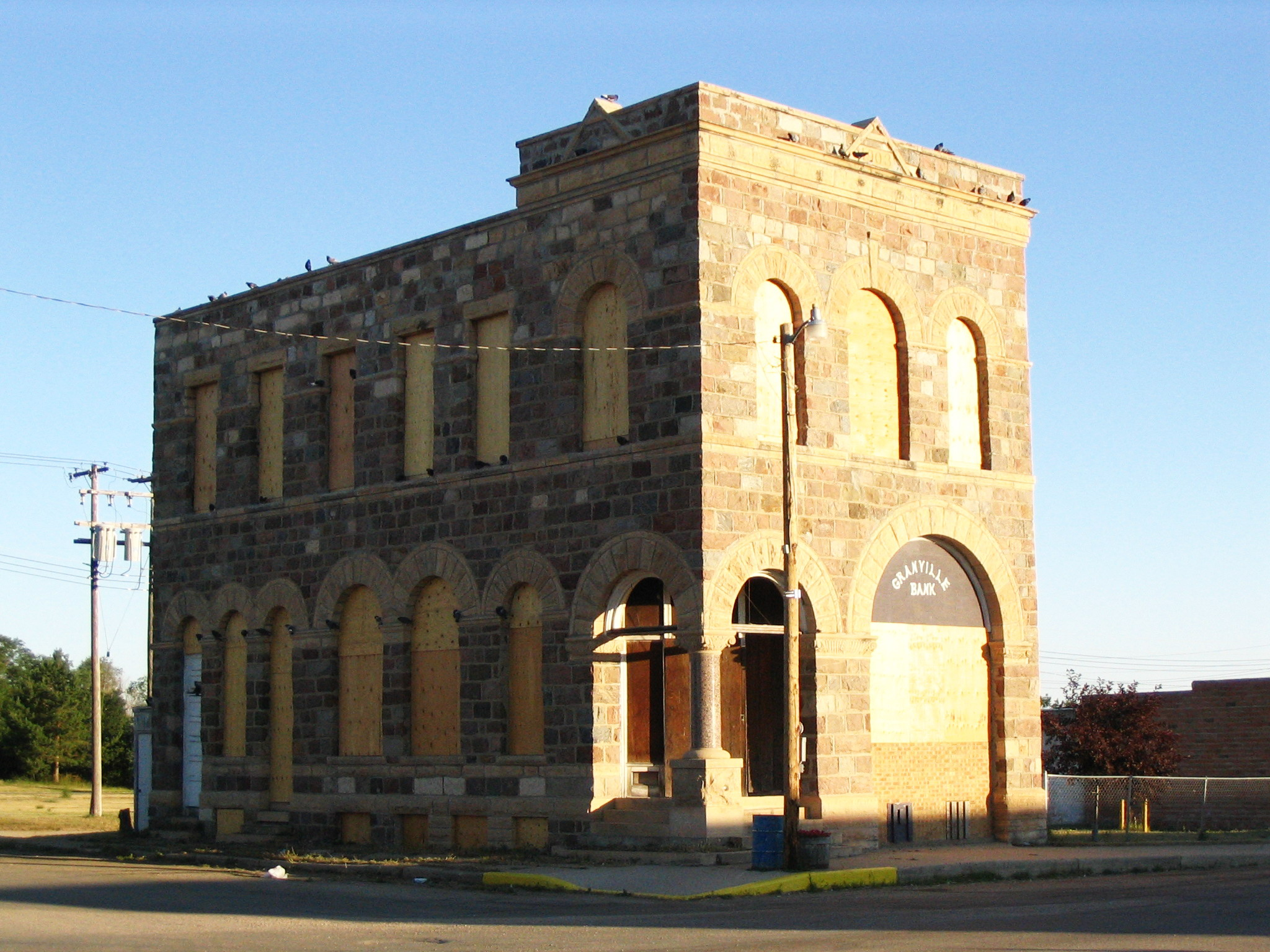
Granville State Bank

The Granville State Bank, on Main Street, was built in 1903 and is listed on the National Register of Historic Places.

== Transportation ==
Amtrak’s Empire Builder, which operates between Seattle/Portland and Chicago, passes through the town on BNSF tracks, but makes no stop. The nearest station is located in Minot, 23 miles (37 km) to the west.
