= Liberty Baptist Church (Evansville, Indiana) =

Historic church in Indiana, United States

- U.S. National Register of Historic Places
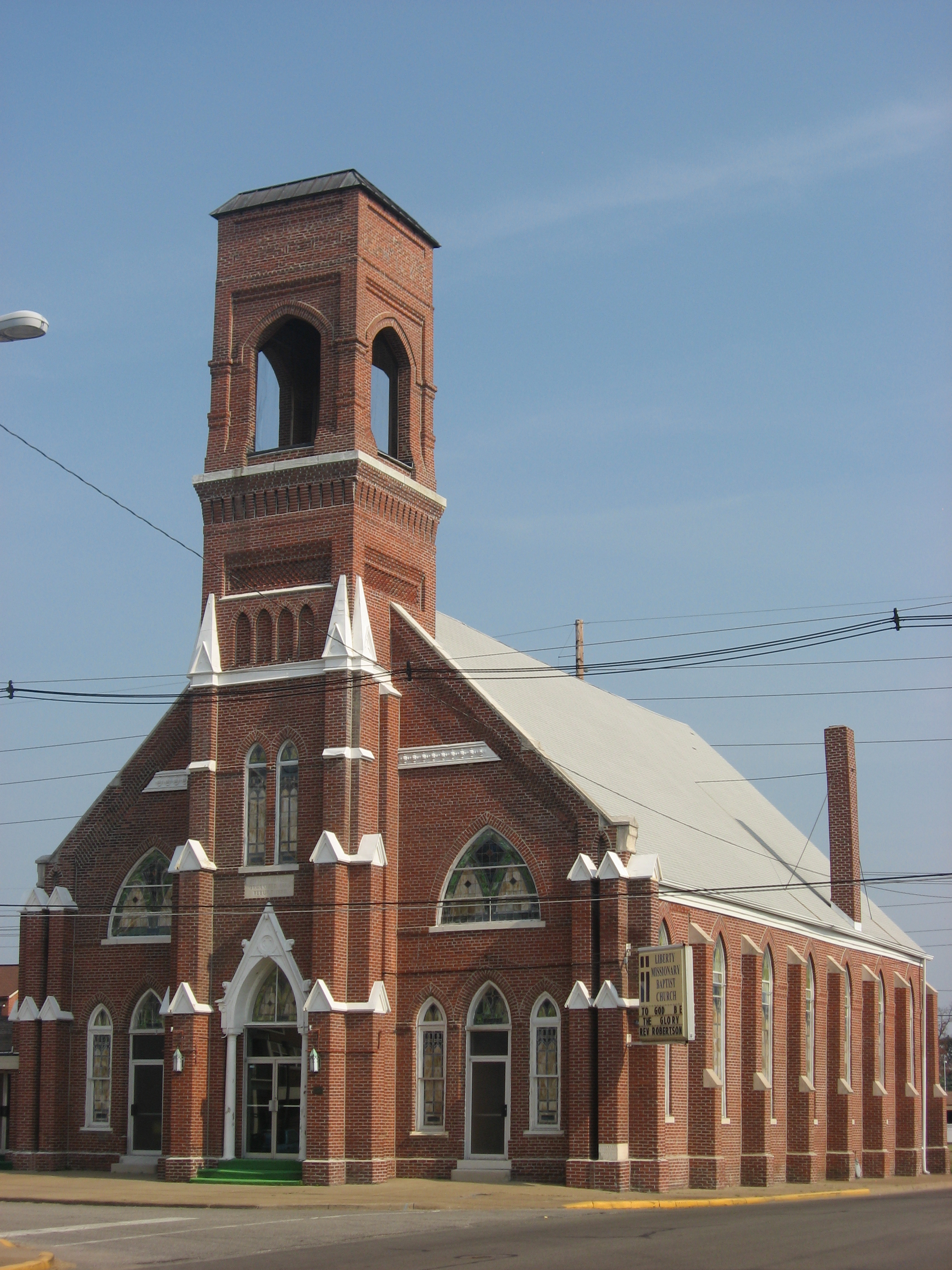

- Location within Indiana Location within the United States
- Location: 701 Oak St., Evansville, Indiana
- Coordinates: 37°58′8″N 87°33′51″W
- Area: less than one acre
- Built: 1887
- Architectural style: Gothic
- NRHP reference No.: 78000058
- Added to NRHP: December 8, 1978

The Liberty Baptist Church is a historic African-American Baptist church located at 701 Oak St. in Evansville, Indiana. It was founded in 1865 as a congregation of former slaves, according to Historic Evansville. The Gothic Revival red brick church was built in 1887, as a replacement after a cyclone destroyed an earlier building.

It was listed on the National Register of Historic Places in 1978.
