= Denbigh, North Dakota =

- Unincorporated community
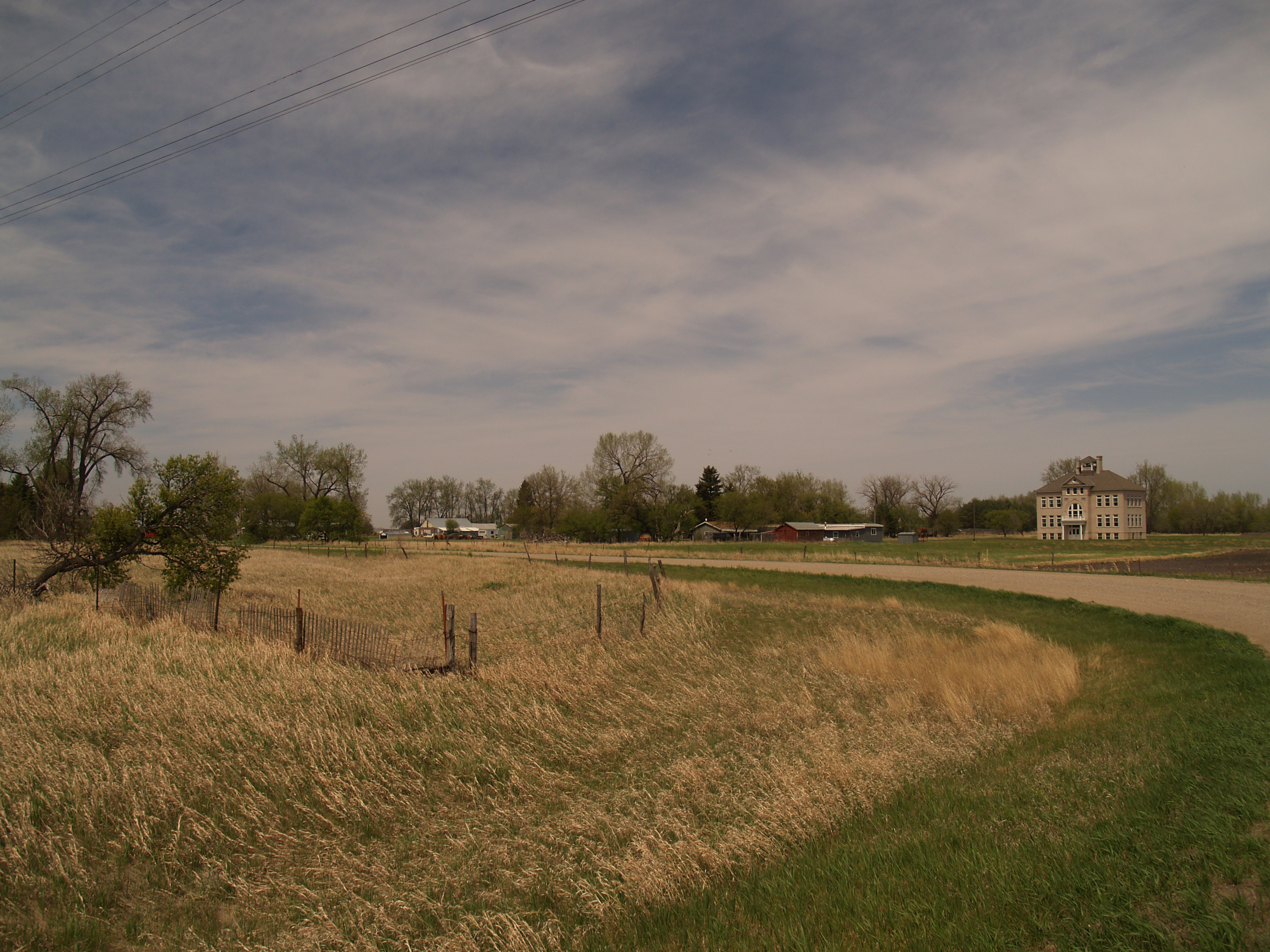

- Location within North Dakota Location within the United States
- Coordinates: 48°18′55″N 100°35′13″W
- Country: United States
- State: North Dakota
- County: McHenry
- Elevation: 1,513 ft (461 m)
- Time zone: UTC-6 (Central (CST))
  - Summer (DST): UTC-5 (CDT)
- Area code: 701
- GNIS feature ID: 1028657

Denbigh is an unincorporated community in McHenry County, North Dakota, United States.

== History ==
A post office was established in 1900 and remained in operation until 1988.

== History ==
The community took its name after Denbigh, in Wales. The population was 55 in 1940.

== Geography ==
It is listed as the nearest community to Norway Lutheran Church and Cemetery, which is actually 10 miles south, and which is listed on the National Register of Historic Places.

== Transportation ==
Amtrak’s Empire Builder, which operates between Seattle/Portland and Chicago, passes through the town on BNSF tracks, but makes no stop. The nearest stations are located in Rugby, 30 miles (48 km) to the east, and Minot, 35 miles (56 km) to the west.
