= Hotel Berry =

Historic hotel building in North Dakota, United States

- U.S. National Register of Historic Places
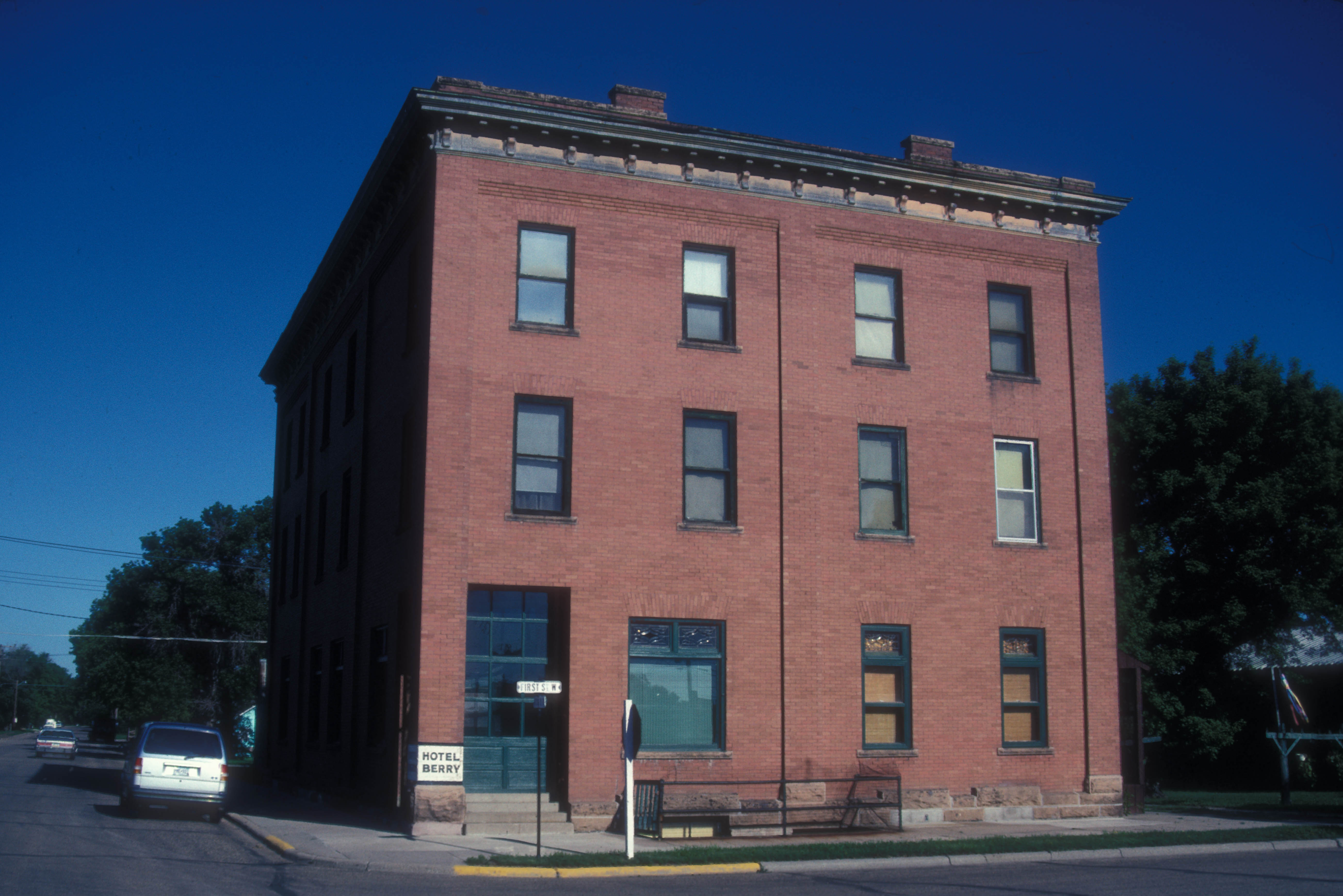

- Location within North Dakota Location within the United States
- Location: 100 W. Central Ave., Velva, North Dakota
- Coordinates: 48°3′36″N 100°55′54″W
- Area: less than one acre
- Built: 1906
- Architectural style: Early Commercial
- NRHP reference No.: 82001343
- Added to NRHP: October 20, 1982

Hotel Berry on W. Central Ave. in Velva, North Dakota, United States, was built in 1906. It was listed on the National Register of Historic Places (NRHP) in 1982. The listing included two contributing buildings.

According to its 1981 NRHP nomination the hotel "represents a genre of first rate hotels built across North Dakota in an era marked by railroad travel and luxury accommodations. It is a visual reminder of the symbiotic relationship between railroad expansion and the development and maintenance of commercial/agricultural centers in the state."
