= Velva, North Dakota =

- City
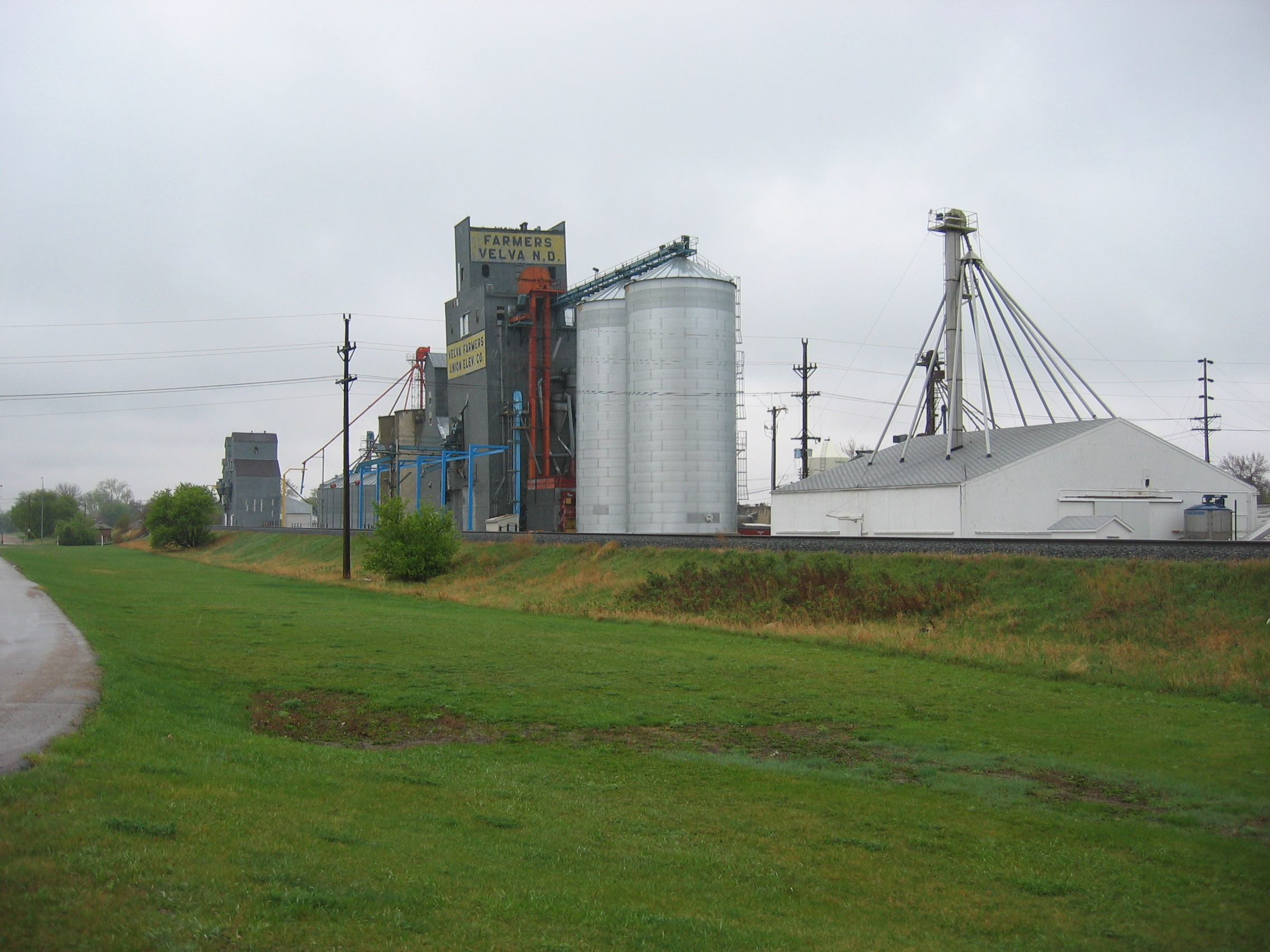

- Logo
- Motto: "The Star City"
- Location of Velva, North Dakota
- Coordinates: 48°03′29″N 100°55′58″W
- Country: United States
- State: North Dakota
- County: McHenry
- Settled: 1886
- Founded: 1897
- Incorporated: 1905

Government
  - Commission President: Michael W. Schreiner

Area
  - Total: 0.97 sq mi (2.50 km^{2})
  - Land: 0.97 sq mi (2.50 km^{2})
  - Water: 0 sq mi (0.00 km^{2})
- Elevation: 1,509 ft (460 m)

Population (2020)
  - Total: 1,086
  - Estimate (2022): 1,064
  - Density: 1,130/sq mi (435/km^{2})
- Time zone: UTC-6 (CST)
  - Summer (DST): UTC-5 (CDT)
- ZIP code: 58790
- Area code: 701
- FIPS code: 38-81620
- GNIS feature ID: 1036307
- Highways: US 52, ND 41
- Website: velvand.com

Velva is a city in McHenry County, North Dakota, United States. Part of the Minot Metropolitan Statistical Area, it was founded in 1897 and the population was 1,086 at the 2020 census. Southeast of Minot, Velva is at the southernmost point of the Souris River. Since Velva is about 20 miles away from the nearby city Minot, Velva has had a slight steady increase of population, which makes Velva a nearby bedroom community for Minot. Velva is home to the first invention of Dot's pretzels, also home to a section of Dot's Pretzels Headquarters.

== History ==
Velva was settled in 1886 with the arrival of the Minneapolis, St. Paul and Sault Ste. Marie Railroad (Soo Line) into the area, and was chartered as a city in 1905. The Hotel Berry was built in 1906 to serve railroad passengers and is now on the National Register of Historic Places.

== Geography ==
According to the United States Census Bureau, the city has a total area of 0.83 square miles (2.15 km^{2}), all land.

=== Climate ===
This climatic region is typified by large seasonal temperature differences, with warm to hot, humid, summers and cold, sometimes severely cold, winters. According to the Köppen Climate Classification system, Velva has a humid continental climate, abbreviated "Dfb" on climate maps.

Climate data for Velva, North Dakota (1991–2020 normals, extremes 1928–2011)
| Month | Jan | Feb | Mar | Apr | May | Jun | Jul | Aug | Sep | Oct | Nov | Dec | Year |
|---|---|---|---|---|---|---|---|---|---|---|---|---|---|
| Record high °F (°C) | 57 (14) | 67 (19) | 83 (28) | 98 (37) | 105 (41) | 107 (42) | 110 (43) | 106 (41) | 108 (42) | 94 (34) | 82 (28) | 66 (19) | 110 (43) |
| Mean daily maximum °F (°C) | 20.2 (−6.6) | 24.4 (−4.2) | 37.0 (2.8) | 53.5 (11.9) | 66.9 (19.4) | 74.5 (23.6) | 80.3 (26.8) | 79.9 (26.6) | 71.0 (21.7) | 55.7 (13.2) | 38.3 (3.5) | 25.2 (−3.8) | 52.2 (11.2) |
| Daily mean °F (°C) | 8.4 (−13.1) | 12.6 (−10.8) | 25.2 (−3.8) | 39.5 (4.2) | 52.6 (11.4) | 61.8 (16.6) | 67.0 (19.4) | 65.4 (18.6) | 56.3 (13.5) | 42.1 (5.6) | 26.6 (−3.0) | 14.2 (−9.9) | 39.3 (4.1) |
| Mean daily minimum °F (°C) | −3.4 (−19.7) | 0.8 (−17.3) | 13.4 (−10.3) | 25.5 (−3.6) | 38.3 (3.5) | 49.1 (9.5) | 53.7 (12.1) | 50.9 (10.5) | 41.5 (5.3) | 28.4 (−2.0) | 14.9 (−9.5) | 3.3 (−15.9) | 26.4 (−3.1) |
| Record low °F (°C) | −50 (−46) | −47 (−44) | −36 (−38) | −12 (−24) | 14 (−10) | 27 (−3) | 34 (1) | 29 (−2) | 13 (−11) | −3 (−19) | −25 (−32) | −38 (−39) | −50 (−46) |
| Average precipitation inches (mm) | 0.67 (17) | 0.50 (13) | 0.75 (19) | 1.07 (27) | 2.70 (69) | 3.63 (92) | 2.73 (69) | 2.20 (56) | 1.56 (40) | 1.53 (39) | 1.27 (32) | 0.57 (14) | 19.18 (487) |
| Average snowfall inches (cm) | 10.3 (26) | 5.3 (13) | 5.2 (13) | 3.1 (7.9) | 0.8 (2.0) | 0.0 (0.0) | 0.0 (0.0) | 0.0 (0.0) | 0.0 (0.0) | 2.2 (5.6) | 4.8 (12) | 9.3 (24) | 41.0 (104) |
| Average precipitation days (≥ 0.01 in) | 3.2 | 2.5 | 2.4 | 3.4 | 7.0 | 9.3 | 7.8 | 5.6 | 4.7 | 3.9 | 3.5 | 3.6 | 56.9 |
| Average snowy days (≥ 0.1 in) | 3.4 | 2.7 | 1.9 | 1.1 | 0.3 | 0.0 | 0.0 | 0.0 | 0.0 | 0.9 | 2.1 | 3.8 | 16.2 |
Source: NOAA

== Demographics ==
Historical population
| Census | Pop. | Note | %± |
|---|---|---|---|
| 1910 | 837 | | — |
| 1920 | 836 | | −0.1% |
| 1930 | 870 | | 4.1% |
| 1940 | 1,017 | | 16.9% |
| 1950 | 1,170 | | 15.0% |
| 1960 | 1,330 | | 13.7% |
| 1970 | 1,241 | | −6.7% |
| 1980 | 1,101 | | −11.3% |
| 1990 | 968 | | −12.1% |
| 2000 | 1,049 | | 8.4% |
| 2010 | 1,084 | | 3.3% |
| 2020 | 1,086 | | 0.2% |
| 2022 (est.) | 1,064 | | −2.0% |
U.S. Decennial Census; 2020 Census

=== 2010 census ===
As of the census of 2010, there were 1,084 people, 452 households and 277 families living in the city. The population density was 1,306.0 inhabitants per square mile (504.2/km^{2}). There were 493 housing units at an average density of 594.0 per square mile (229.3/km^{2}). The racial makeup of the city was 98.7% White, 0.4% Native American, 0.1% Asian, 0.2% from other races, and 0.6% from two or more races. Hispanic or Latino of any race were 1.4% of the population.

There were 452 households, of which 26.3% had children under the age of 18 living with them, 48.9% were married couples living together, 9.1% had a female householder with no husband present, 3.3% had a male householder with no wife present, and 38.7% were non-families. 34.7% of all households were made up of individuals, and 18.1% had someone living alone who was 65 years of age or older. The average household size was 2.29 and the average family size was 2.92.

The average age in the city was 42.7 years. 24.4% of residents were under the age of 18; 5.6% were between the ages of 18 and 24; 22.7% were from 25 to 44; 24.1% were from 45 to 64; and 23.2% were 65 years of age or older. The gender makeup of the city was 47.1% male and 52.9% female.

=== 2000 census ===
As of the census of 2000, there were 1,049 people, 436 households, and 275 families living in the city. The population density was 1,359.7 inhabitants per square mile (525.0/km^{2}). There were 483 housing units at an average density of 626.1 per square mile (241.7/km^{2}). The racial makeup of the city was 99.33% White, 0.10% African American, 0.19% Native American, and 0.38% from two or more races. Hispanic or Latino of any race were 0.48% of the population.

There were 436 households, out of which 31.2% had children under the age of 18 living with them, 50.2% were married couples living together, 8.5% had a female householder with no husband present, and 36.9% were non-families. 34.4% of all households were made up of individuals, and 20.6% had someone living alone who was 65 years of age or older. The average household size was 2.30 and the average family size was 2.97.

In the city, the population was spread out, with 25.6% under the age of 18, 5.1% from 18 to 24, 23.6% from 25 to 44, 19.6% from 45 to 64, and 26.0% who were 65 years of age or older. The median age was 42 years. For every 100 females, there were 89.0 males. For every 100 females age 18 and over, there were 79.7 males.

The median income for a household in the city was $27,738, and the median income for a family was $36,477. Males had a median income of $26,726 versus $17,375 for females. The per capita income for the city was $15,267. About 7.8% of families and 10.8% of the population were below the poverty line, including 8.5% of those under age 18 and 17.3% of those age 65 or over.

== Education ==
Velva Public School is the community's public school, serving students in grades kindergarten through 12.

== Notable people ==
- Dorothy "Dot" Henke, founder of Dot's Homestyle Pretzels
- Eric Sevareid (1912–1992), broadcast journalist, was born in Velva and spent his first twelve years there.

== See also ==
- Alfred and Clara Sevareid House
