= Elliott Bridge =

- U.S. National Register of Historic Places
- Location within North Dakota Location within the United States
- Nearest city: Towner, North Dakota
- Coordinates: 48°24′27″N 100°23′45″W
- Area: less than one acre
- Built: 1902
- Built by: Fargo Bridge & Iron Co.
- Architectural style: Pratt through truss
- MPS: Historic Roadway Bridges of North Dakota MPS
- NRHP reference No.: 97000181
- Added to NRHP: February 27, 1997

The Elliott Bridge, in North Dakota, United States, also known as Souris River Bridge, was built by Fargo Bridge & Iron Co. in 1902. The bridge "was designed to replace a county-owned ferry boat that had been operating across the Souris River at 'the Elliott Place.'" It was listed on the National Register of Historic Places in 1997. It is owned and maintained by McHenry County.

== See also ==
- Eastwood Park Bridge: NRHP-listed Souris River crossing in Minot, North Dakota
- Westgaard Bridge: NRHP listed Souris River crossing also in McHenry County, North Dakota
