= Canoeing with the Cree =

- Author: Eric Sevareid
- Language: English
- Publisher: The MacMillan Company
- Publication date: 1935
- Publication place: United States
- Media type: Print

Canoeing with the Cree is a 1935 book by journalist Eric Sevareid, recounting a canoe trip that he and friend Walter Port embarked on in 1930.

== History and title ==
Prior to the trip, which took place during the summer of 1930 and was sponsored by the Minneapolis Star, Sevareid and Port had just graduated from high school and set out to canoe from their hometown in Minneapolis, Minnesota, United States to York Factory on the Hudson Bay of Canada.

The initial route took them up the Minnesota River and its tributary, the Little Minnesota River, to Browns Valley, Minnesota. Sevareid and Port then portaged to Lake Traverse and descended the Bois des Sioux River to the Red River of the North, which led to Lake Winnipeg, finally paddling down the Nelson River, Gods River, and Hayes River to Hudson Bay. The trip lasted nearly four months and extended more than 2,250 miles.

The book's title refers to Sevareid and Port encountering and interacting with the Cree nation on Lake Winnipeg during their journey.

== Cultural impact ==
Since its initial publication, Canoeing with the Cree has inspired several canoeists to fully or partially recreate the path taken in the book.

The story served as crucial literary inspiration for Minnesota aviation pioneer Scott D. Anderson's 1990 book, Distant Fires, where Anderson and a friend retraced the journey of Sevareid and Port from Duluth to York Factory. Distant Fires went on to gain statewide success and an American Library Association award, with Sevareid praising the book's "happy phrasing".

In the spring of 2008, two teenagers from Chaska, Minnesota sought to replicate Sevareid and Port's exact route: Sean Bloomfield and Colton Witte completed the journey in 49 days, garnering national attention along the way. In 2016, Bloomfield authored Adventure North, which chronicles their 2,200 mile voyage.

In 2011, Natalie Warren and Ann Raiho paddled the route, becoming the first women to do so. Warren later wrote Hudson Bay Bound about the trip, published in 2021.
