= Liberty Baptist Church (Kief, North Dakota) =

Historic church in North Dakota, United States

- U.S. National Register of Historic Places
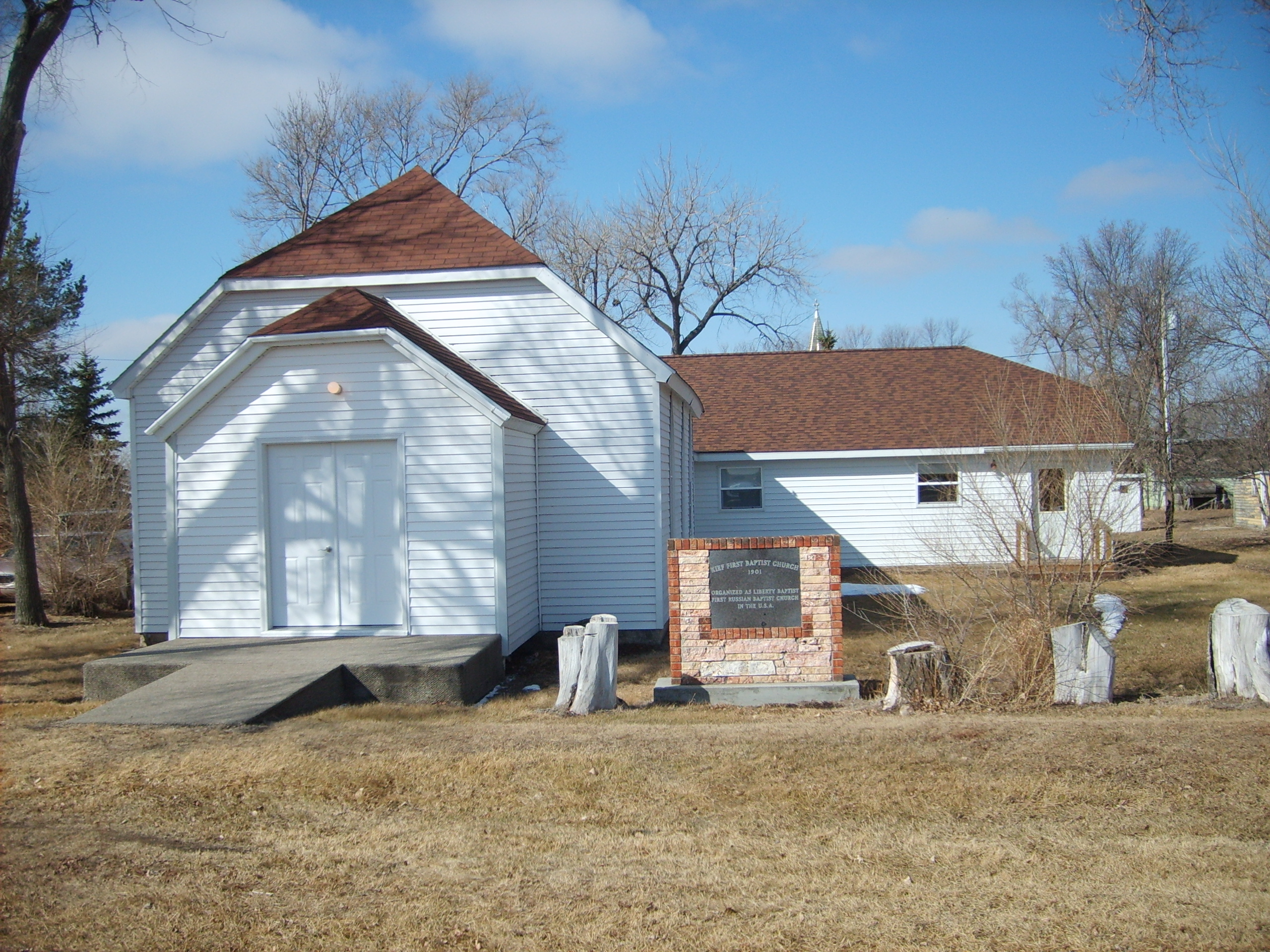

- Location within North Dakota Location within the United States
- Location: Fifth & Christina Sts., Kief, North Dakota
- Coordinates: 47°51′24″N 100°31′29″W
- Area: less than one acre
- Built: 1902
- Architectural style: Late Gothic Revival
- MPS: Ukrainian Immigrant Dwellings and Churches in North Dakota from Early Settlement Until the Depression MPS
- NRHP reference No.: 87001789
- Added to NRHP: October 16, 1987

Liberty Baptist Church at Fifth & Christina Sts. in Kief, North Dakota was built in 1902. It included Late Gothic Revival architecture.

The church was the first "Stundist" church built in North America. It has a hipped roof that is similar in design to the roofs of pioneer homes built by Ukrainian immigrants to the upper Great Plains.

The building was moved in 1936 to its current location. It was listed on the National Register of Historic Places in 1987.
