= Land Township, McHenry County, North Dakota =

Civil township in North Dakota, U.S.

Coordinates: 47°52′00″N 100°32′02″W

Land Township is a civil township in McHenry County in the U.S. state of North Dakota. As of the 2000 census, its population was 48. The population in 2009 was estimated at 42. The township was organized in 1907.
