= Souris River =

River in Canada and the United States

Souris River Mouse River, Rivière Souris
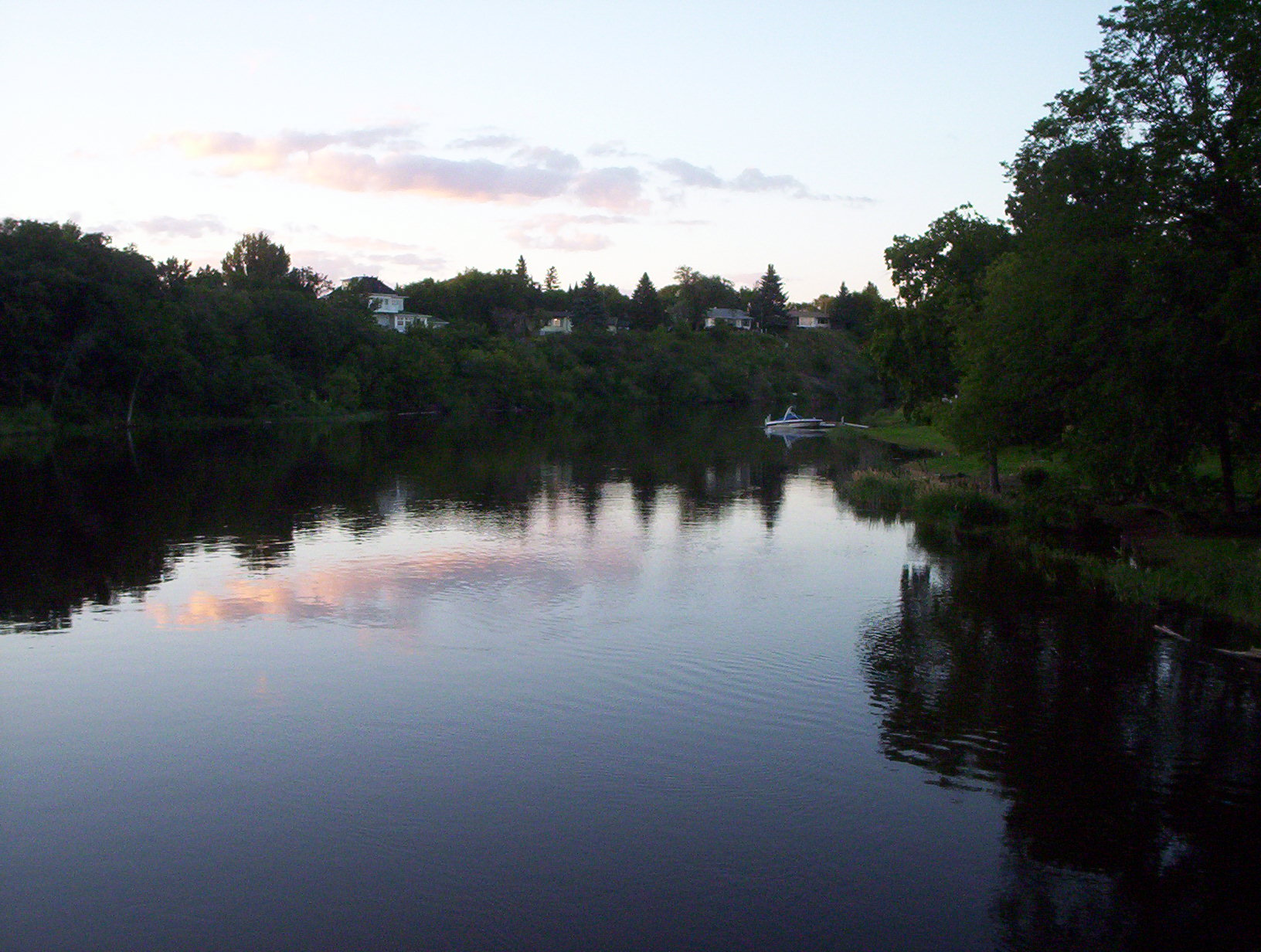
- The river in the town of Souris, Manitoba

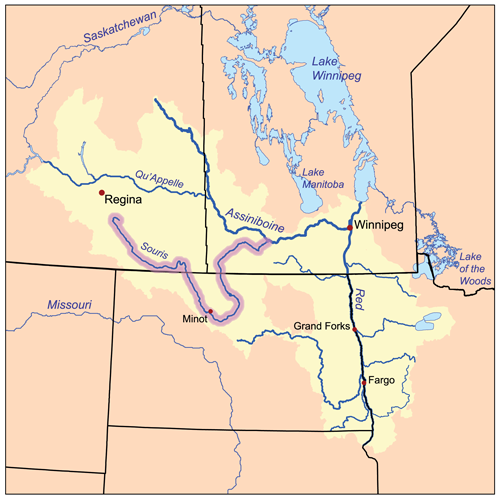
- The Red River drainage basin, with the Souris River highlighted

Location
- Countries: Canada; United States
- Provinces: Manitoba; Saskatchewan
- State: North Dakota
- Cities: Minot, ND; Souris, MB; Weyburn, SK; Melita, MB

Physical characteristics
- Source: north of Weyburn
  - location: Saskatchewan
  - coordinates: 49°49′53″N 103°47′46″W
- Mouth: Assiniboine River
  - location: Manitoba, Canada
  - coordinates: 49°39′54″N 99°34′07″W
- Length: 700 km (430 mi)
- Basin size: 61,000 km^{2} (24,000 sq mi)
- Discharge
  - location: Weyburn, SK; river mile 97.9 (river kilometre 157.6)

Basin features
- River system: Red River drainage basin
- Tributaries
  - left: Antler
  - right: Gainsborough

The Souris River (/ˈsʊərɪs/; French: rivière Souris) or Mouse River (as it is alternatively known in the U.S., a translation of its French name) is a river in central North America. Approximately 700 kilometres (430 miles) in length, it drains about 61,100 km^{2} (23,600 sq mi) of land in Canada and the United States.

Rising in southeastern Saskatchewan in the Yellow Grass Marshes north of Weyburn, the river wanders southeast into the U.S. through North Dakota beyond Minot to its most southern point at Velva, and then back north into Canada in southwestern Manitoba. The primary tributary in the U.S. is the Des Lacs River; the confluence is at Burlington, a few miles northwest of central Minot.

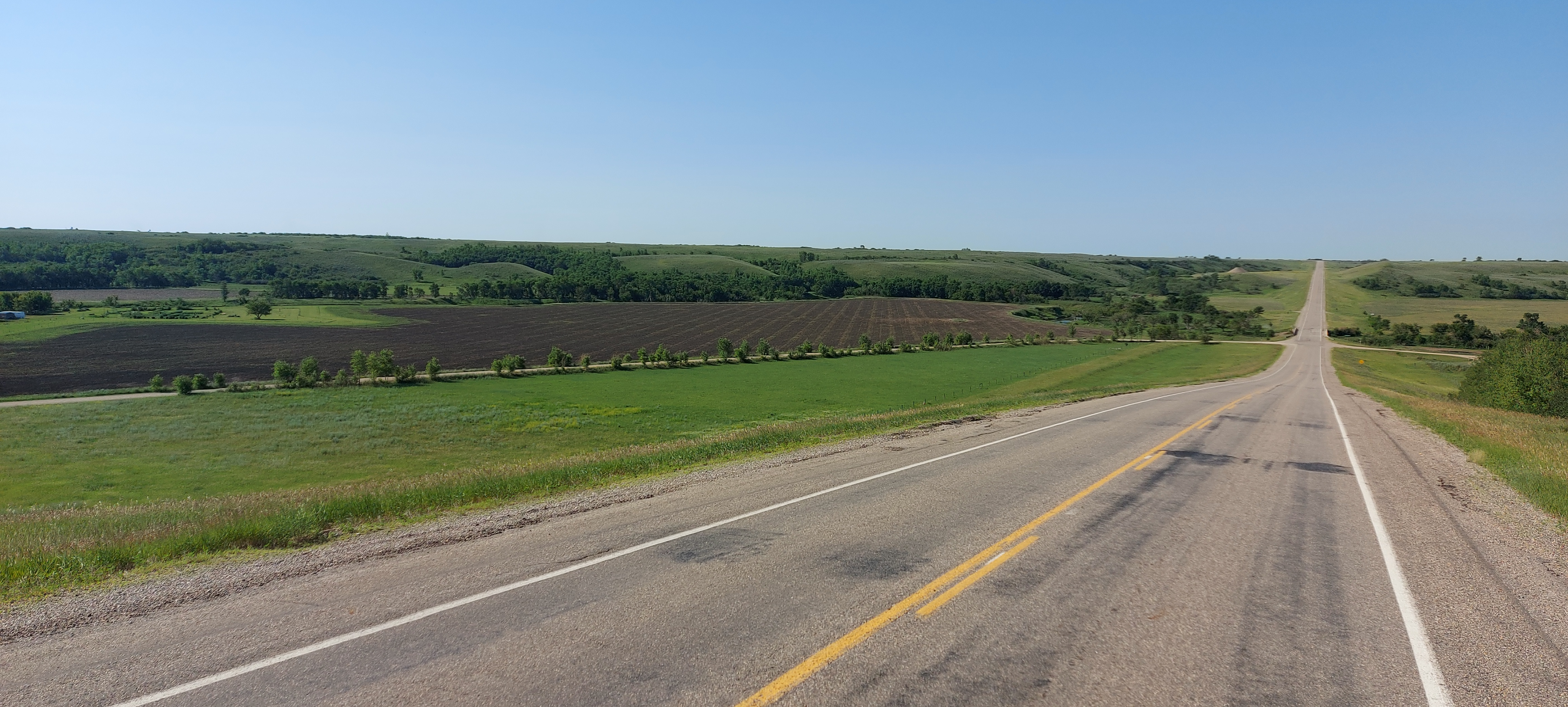
Saskatchewan Highway 9 in the upper Souris River Valley

Flowing northeast in Manitoba, it passes through the communities of Melita, Hartney, Souris, and Wawanesa, prior to the confluence with the Assiniboine River near Treesbank, about 40 km (25 mi) southeast of Brandon. The main tributaries of the Souris in Manitoba are the Antler River, Gainsborough Creek, and Plum Creek. The elevation at the confluence is approximately 340 m (1,120 ft) above sea level.

At the end of the last ice age, over 10,000 years ago, the rapid draining of Glacial Lake Regina eroded a large channel that is now occupied by the much smaller contemporary Souris River. Also, much of the drainage basin is fertile silt and clay deposited by another former glacial lake, Lake Souris.

== Flow rates and flood potential ==
During the period from 1930 to 1941 severe drought conditions prevailed and Canada's Prairie Farm Rehabilitation Administration (PFRA) constructed four stock watering dams. In 1937 the Snyder and Ross Dams were built near Melita. In 1938 the Napinka Dam was built and the Hartney Dam was built in 1941. These were all stop-log dams with a total capacity of 2,400 acre-feet (3,000,000 m^{3}). The Souris Dam was originally built in 1911 and was rebuilt in 1935. The Wawanesa Dam was completed in 1951 storing about 320 acre-feet (390,000 m^{3}) of water.

Most of the annual flow of the Souris River comes from snow melt and spring rains. The annual flow volume varies dramatically from 3,400 acre-feet (4,200,000 m^{3}) in 1937 to 2,100,000 acre-feet (2.6 km^{3}) in 1976. It is expected that the total runoff for 2011 at Wawanesa will exceed 3,800,000 acre-feet (4.7 km^{3}), about a one in 500-year event. The average annual runoff is equivalent to 3 mm over the entire Souris River watershed.

Two large dams in Saskatchewan, Rafferty Dam and Grant Devine Dam were built, in part, to reduce flood peaks on the Souris River.

In summer 2011, a historic flood affected much of the Souris River basin, overtopping levees and causing the evacuation of about 11,000 residents in Minot as well as significant damage to farmland and other property along the length of the river.

The channel capacity of the river in Manitoba varies from about 150 cubic feet per second (4.2 m^{3}/s) near the border, to about 1,400 cu ft/s (40 m^{3}/s) through Melita, to about 1,100 cu ft/s (31 m^{3}/s) near Lauder and 1,700 cu ft/s (48 m^{3}/s) near Hartney. North of Hartney the capacity increases to more than 3,000 cu ft/s (85 m^{3}/s). The drop between the border and Hartney is only about six inches per mile (9.5 cm/km).

Location	1882 peak flow (cfs) (estimated)	1976 peak flow (cfs)	2011 peak flow (cfs)
Minot	22,800	9,350	26,900
Westhope	18,500	12,400	30,400
Melita	30,000	21,300	26,800
Souris	N/A	24,800	28,200
Wawanesa	39,900	26,200	27,800

== Tributaries ==
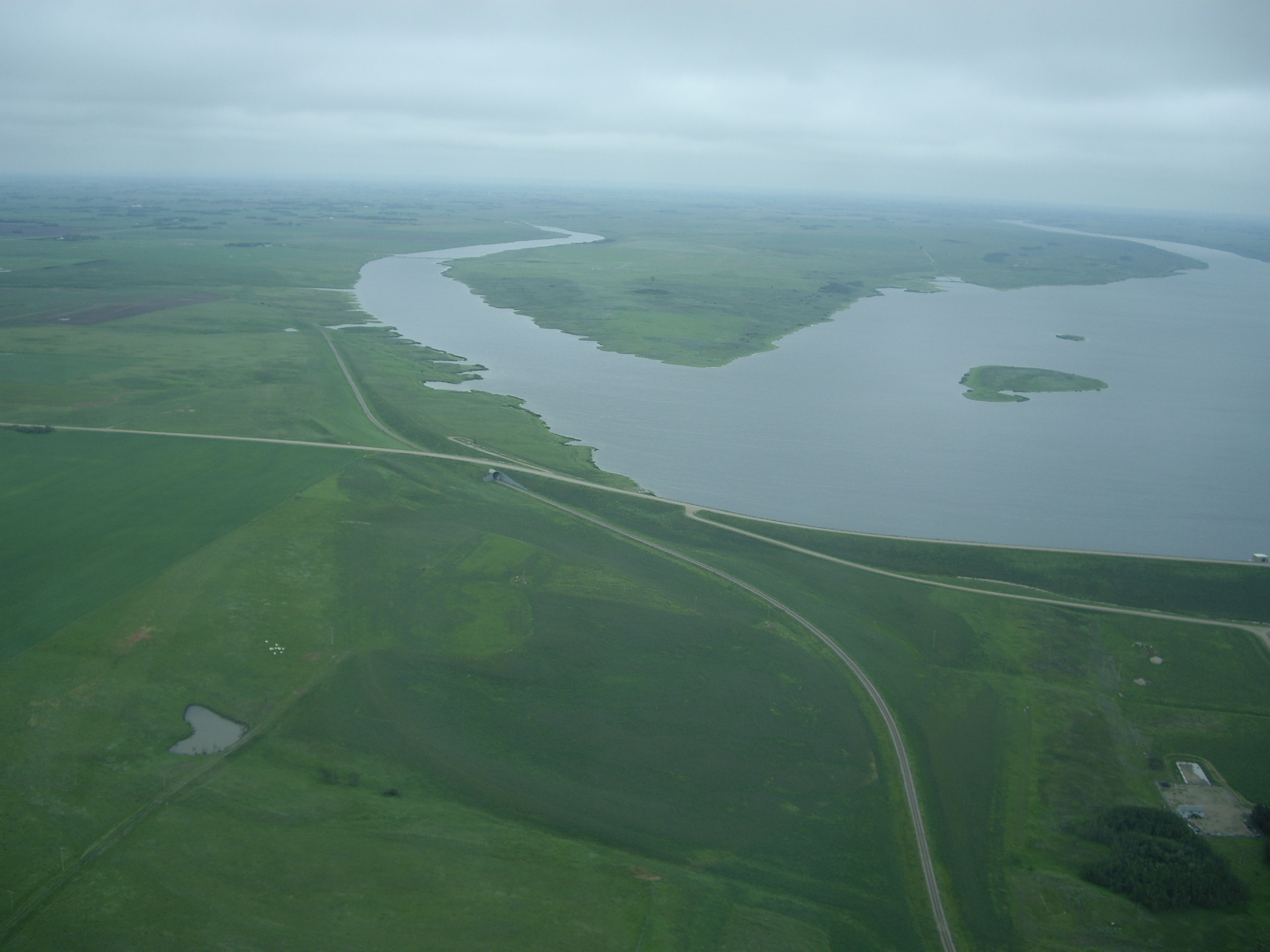
Grant Devine Dam and Reservoir on Moose Mountain Creek

- Long Creek
- Short Creek
- Moose Mountain Creek
- Des Lacs River
- Livingston Creek
- Wintering River
- Deep River
  - Little Deep Creek
    - Spring Coulee
  - Cut Bank Creek (North Dakota)
    - North Lake
      - Egg Creek
        - Hay Coulee
      - Buffalo Lodge Lake
        - South Egg Creek
- Willow Creek
  - Snake Creek (North Dakota)
  - Oak Creek
  - Ox Creek
    - Wolf Creek
- Plum Creek (Manitoba), a river that drains Plum Lakes and Oak Lake (Manitoba) into the Souris River
  - Stony Creek, flows into Maple Lake, which drains into Plum Lakes
  - Pipestone Creek (Saskatchewan), flows into Oak Lake
    - Little Pipestone Creek
    - Montgomery Creek
- Jackson Creek
- Graham Creek
- Boundary Creek (North Dakota)
- Antler River
- Gainsborough Creek

== Communities along the river ==
=== Cities and towns ===
- Weyburn, Saskatchewan
- Estevan, Saskatchewan
- Roche Percee, Saskatchewan
- Oxbow, Saskatchewan
- Burlington, North Dakota
- Minot, North Dakota
- Velva, North Dakota
- Towner, North Dakota
- Westhope, North Dakota
- Melita, Manitoba
- Souris, Manitoba
- Wawanesa, Manitoba

=== Rural Municipalities ===
- Souris Valley No. 7, Saskatchewan
- Municipality of Grassland
- Municipality of Oakland-Wawanesa

== Bridges across the river ==
- Eastwood Park Bridge: NRHP-listed crossing in Minot, North Dakota
- Elliott Bridge: NRHP-listed crossing in McHenry County, North Dakota
- Westgaard Bridge: NRHP listed crossing in McHenry County, North Dakota

== Fish species ==
Fish species include walleye, yellow perch, northern pike, white sucker, black bullhead, goldeye, brown bullhead, smallmouth bass, and burbot.

== See also ==
- List of rivers of Manitoba
- List of rivers of North Dakota
- List of rivers of Saskatchewan
