= Alfred and Clara Sevareid House =

Historic house in North Dakota, United States

- U.S. National Register of Historic Places
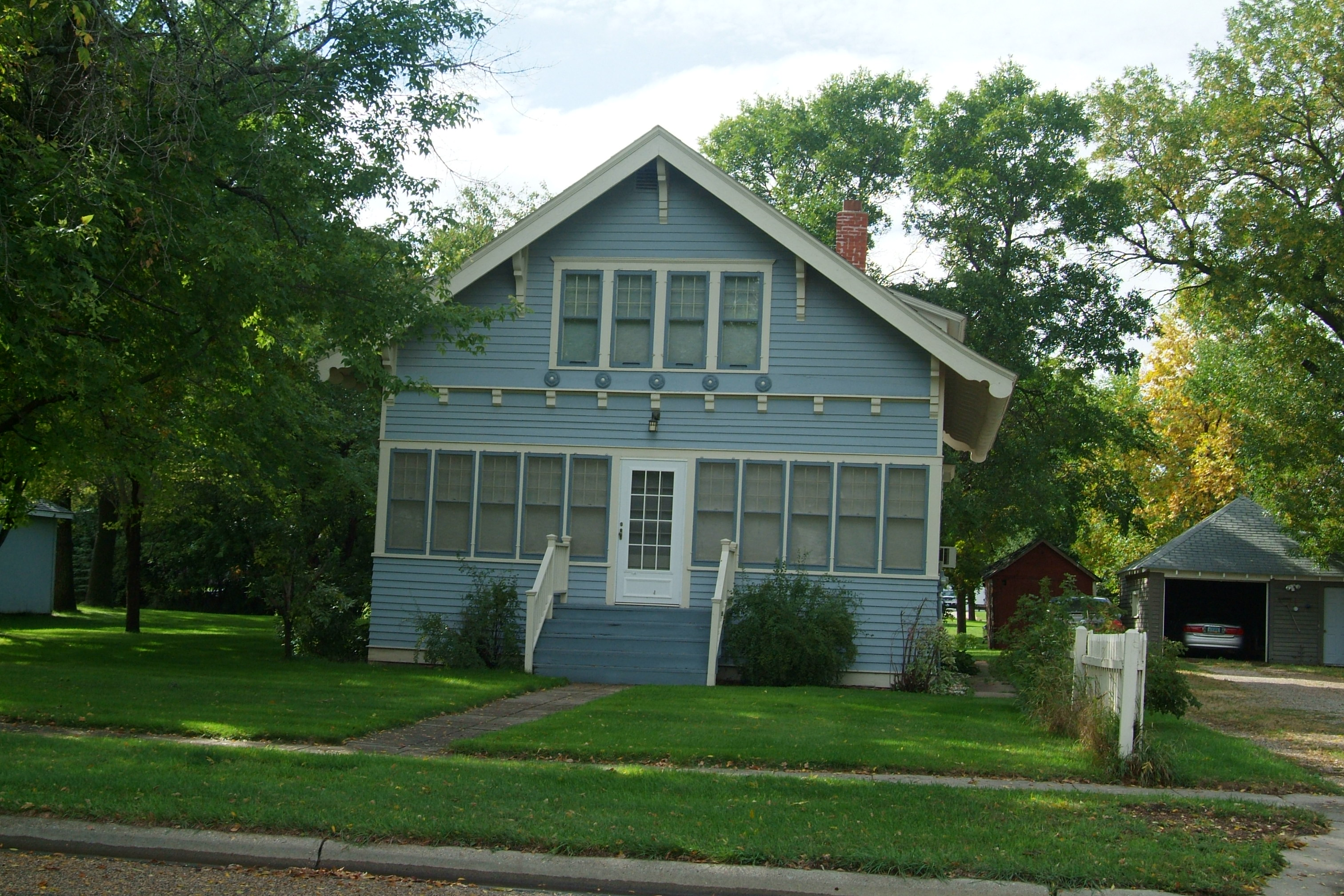

- Location within North Dakota Location within the United States
- Location: 405 2nd St., W, Velva, North Dakota
- Coordinates: 48°3′41″N 100°55′51″W
- Area: less than one acre
- Built: 1913
- Architect: Nelson, A.W.
- Architectural style: Bungalow/Craftsman
- NRHP reference No.: 96001066
- Added to NRHP: October 3, 1996

The Alfred and Clara Sevareid House on 2nd St., W., in Velva, North Dakota was built in 1913. It was listed on the National Register of Historic Places in 1996.

According to its NRHP nomination, it was evaluated to be "the best example" out of all eight Craftsman architecture bungalow houses existing in Velva in 1987.

Alfred Eric Sevareid (1882-1953) was born in Kenyon, Minnesota. Clara Pauline Elizabeth Hougen (1885–1969) was born in Fargo, North Dakota. Both attended Luther College in Decorah, Iowa where they met and married prior to locating in Velva. They were the parents of CBS news journalist Eric Sevareid (1912–1992), and the family moved to the house shortly after Eric's birth.
