= Eric Sevareid =

American journalist (1912–1992)

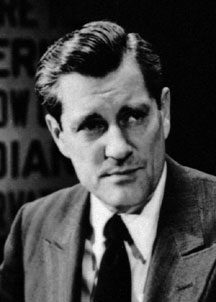
- Born: Arnold Eric Sevareid; November 26, 1912; Velva, North Dakota, U.S.
- Died: July 9, 1992 (aged 79); Washington, D.C., U.S.
- Education: University of Minnesota (B.A. 1935)
- Occupations: News journalist, author
- Years active: 1930–1990
- Employer: CBS
- Notable work: Canoeing with the Cree (1935)
- Television: CBS Evening News (1965–1977)
- Spouses: Lois Finger (m. 1935; div. 1962) Belén Marshall (m. 1963; div. 1974) Suzanne St. Pierre (m. 1979)
- Children: 3
- Awards: Peabody Award (1950, 1964, 1968); Television Academy Hall of Fame (1987); Emmy Award nominee (1955, 1958); For More: See Honors

Arnold Eric Sevareid (November 26, 1912 – July 9, 1992) was an American author and CBS news journalist from 1939 to 1977. He was one of a group of elite war correspondents who were hired by CBS newsman Edward R. Murrow and nicknamed "Murrow's Boys." Sevareid was the first to report the Fall of Paris in 1940, when the city was captured by German forces during World War II.

Sevareid followed in Murrow's footsteps as a commentator on the CBS Evening News for thirteen years, for which he was recognized with Emmy and Peabody Awards.

== Early life ==
Sevareid was born in Velva, North Dakota to Alfred Eric and Clara Pauline Elizabeth Sevareid (née Hougen). The town's economy was largely dependent on wheat farming. According to Sevareid, his neighbors were extremely charitable towards friends but very wary of outsiders; it was an egalitarian but politically conservative community. After the failure of the bank in Velva in 1925, his family moved to nearby Minot, and then to Minneapolis, Minnesota, settling on 30th Avenue North. He attended Central High School in Minneapolis. Sevareid graduated from the University of Minnesota in 1935. A descendant of Norwegian immigrants, he preserved a strong bond with the country of Norway throughout his life.

Sevareid was adventurous from a young age; several days after he graduated from Central High School in 1930, he and his friend Walter Port embarked on an expedition sponsored by the Minneapolis Star to travel by canoe from Minneapolis to York Factory, on Hudson Bay. They canoed up the Minnesota River and its tributary, the Little Minnesota River, to Browns Valley, portaged to Lake Traverse, and descended the Bois des Sioux River to the Red River of the North, which led to Lake Winnipeg. They then went down the Nelson River, Gods River, and Hayes River to Hudson Bay, a trip of 2,250 miles (3,620 km). Sevareid's book Canoeing with the Cree (1935) was the result of this canoe trip and is still in print.

== Early career ==
At age 18, Sevareid entered journalism as a reporter for the Minneapolis Journal while he was a student at the University of Minnesota in political science. At the Journal, he wrote a five-part series on the Silver Shirts. He was disappointed with the way the editors portrayed the organization as ridiculous rather than a legitimate political threat. He received many personal threats of physical force in response to the story, but believed that the people issuing them were too cowardly to follow through.

He continued his studies abroad, first in London, and then at the Sorbonne University in Paris, where he also worked as an editor for United Press. Sevareid then became city editor of the Paris Herald Tribune, and later joined CBS as a foreign correspondent based in Paris.

Sevareid broadcast the Fall of Paris and followed the French government from there to Bordeaux and then Vichy before he left France for London and later Washington, D.C. He was appointed as CBS's Washington bureau chief in July 1942.

He wrote about the Plains influence on his life in his early memoir, Not So Wild A Dream (1946). The book is still in print and covers his life in Velva, his family, the Hudson Bay trip, his hitchhiking around the U.S., mining in the Sierra Nevada, the Great Depression years, his early journalism, and (especially) his experiences in World War II.

== Wartime reporting ==
=== Relationship with Edward Murrow ===
Sevareid's work during World War II, with Edward Murrow as one of the original Murrow's Boys, was at the forefront of broadcasting. In 1940, he was the first to report on the Fall of France. Shortly afterward, he joined Murrow to report on the Battle of Britain. Later, Sevareid would refer fondly to the early years working with Murrow: "We were like a young band of brothers in those early radio days with Murrow." In his final broadcast with CBS, in 1977, he would call Murrow the man who "invented me."

=== Rescue in Burma ===
On August 2, 1943, Sevareid was on board a Curtiss-Wright C-46 Commando that, having taken off from Assam in India, developed engine trouble over Burma while it was on a Hump airlift mission. He grabbed a bottle of Carew's gin before he parachuted out of the plane. The U.S. Army Air Forces formed a search and rescue team to bring the group out from behind enemy lines. The operatives parachuted in, located the party, and evacuated them safely to India, for which John Paton Davies Jr. later won the Medal of Freedom. Davies was a U.S. diplomat who, having been a passenger himself, initially led the group away from the crash site and out of harm's way before the rescuers arrived.

=== Yugoslavia ===
In Yugoslavia, Sevareid later reported on Josip Broz Tito's Yugoslav Partisans.

== Later career ==
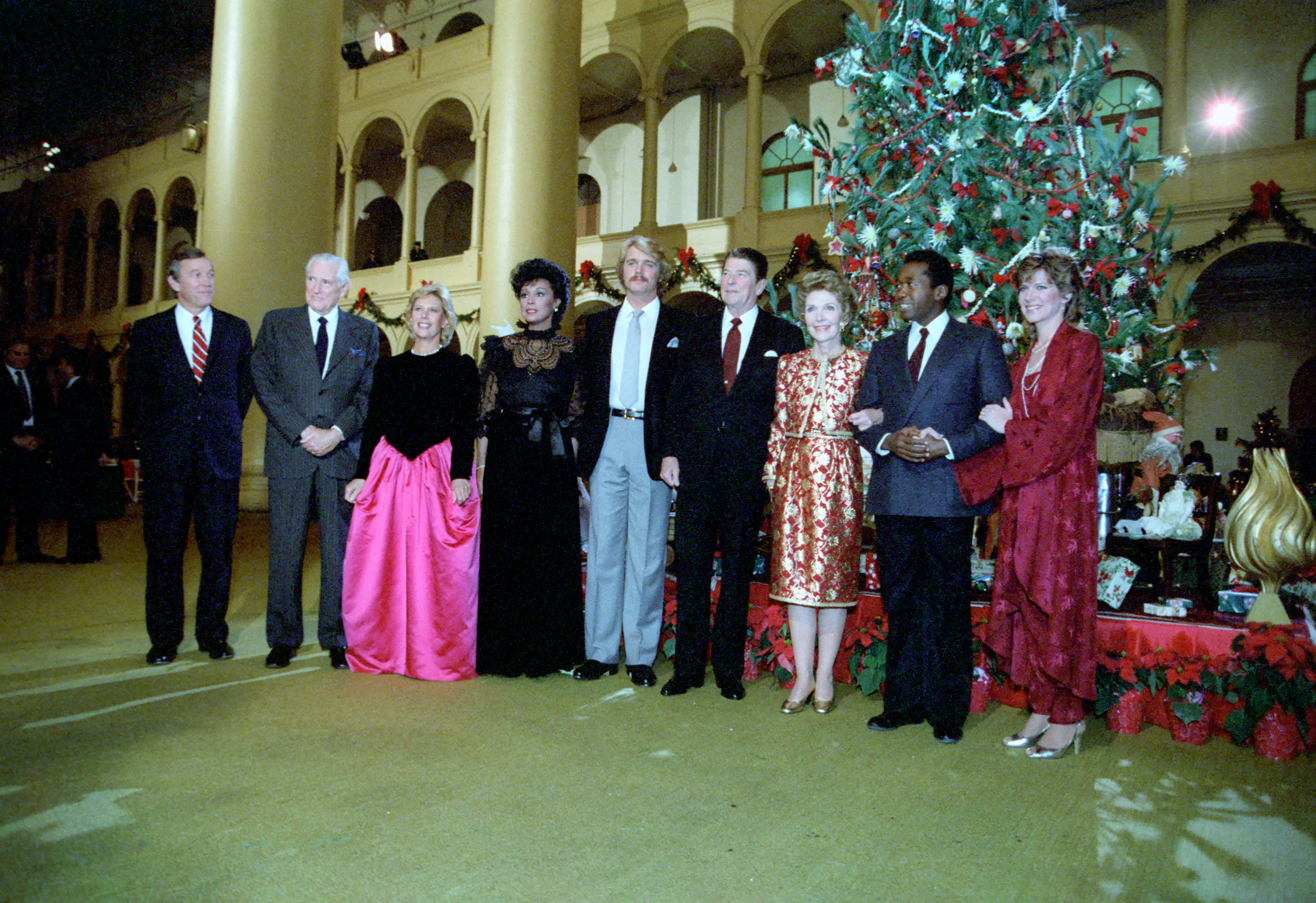
U.S. President Ronald Reagan and First Lady Nancy Reagan with a group at NBC's taping of its "Christmas in Washington" special in the Pension Building in Washington, D.C. (1982). Left to right: NBC News anchor Roger Mudd, CBS News reporter Eric Sevareid, entertainer Dinah Shore, actress Diahann Carroll, actor and musician John Schneider, President Ronald Reagan, First Lady Nancy Reagan, actor Ben Vereen, and singer Debby Boone.

After the war, Sevareid continued to work for CBS. He had begun his own program, Eric Sevareid and the News, on June 27, 1942, on CBS; it ran for five minutes, starting at 8:55 (ET) on Saturdays and Sundays. In 1946, he reported on the founding of the United Nations and then penned Not So Wild a Dream (University of Missouri Press, 1946). The book, whose title comes from part of the closing passage of Norman Corwin's radio play On a Note of Triumph, appeared in eleven printings and became one of the primary sources on the lives of the generation of Americans who had lived through the Great Depression, only to confront the horrors of World War II. In the 1976 edition of the book, Sevareid wrote, "It was a lucky stroke of timing to have been born and lived as an American in this last generation. It was good fortune to be a journalist in Washington, now the single news headquarters in the world since ancient Rome. But we are not Rome; the world is too big, too varied."

Sevareid always considered himself a writer first and often felt uneasy behind a microphone and even less comfortable on television. Nonetheless, he worked extensively for CBS News on television for decades after the war. During the middle and the end of 1950s, Sevareid found himself on television as the host and science reporter of CBS's Conquest. He also served as the head of the CBS Washington bureau from 1946 to 1954 and was one of the early critics of Joseph McCarthy's anticommunism tactics.

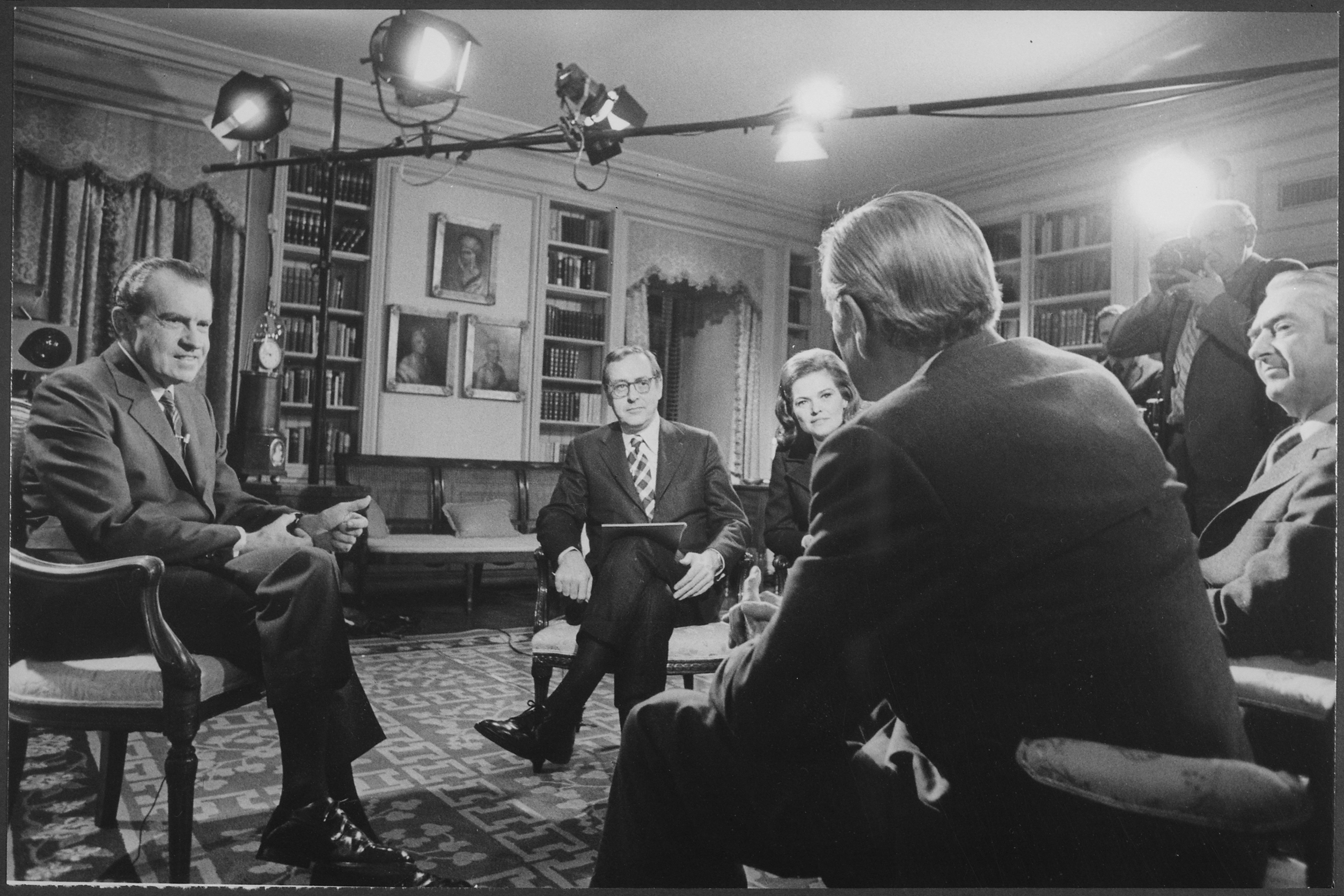
Sevareid interviewing President Richard Nixon at the White House for A Conversation With the President (1970)

=== European correspondent ===
Sevareid wound up the 1950s as CBS's roving European correspondent from 1959 to 1961. He contributed stories to CBS Reports during that time and served as moderator on a number of CBS series such as Town Meeting of the World, The Great Challenge, Where We Stand, and Years of Crisis. Sevareid also appeared in or on CBS coverage of every presidential election from 1948 to 1976, the year before his retirement.

=== Final interview with Adlai Stevenson ===
One of Sevareid's biggest scoops from this time period was his 1965 exclusive interview with Adlai Stevenson II shortly before Stevenson's death. The interview was not broadcast over CBS but instead appeared in Look magazine.

=== CBS Evening News appearances ===
On November 22, 1963, Sevareid joined Walter Cronkite on CBS television with a commentary about the assassination of John F. Kennedy and the road ahead for the new president, Lyndon Johnson. From 1964 to his 1977 retirement from the network, Sevareid's two-minute segments on the CBS Evening News (anchored by Cronkite) inspired his admirers to dub him "The Grey Eminence."

During his long run as a commentator, his segments earned both Emmy and Peabody Awards. In 1987, he was honored as an inductee into the Academy's Fourth Hall of Fame. Those who disagreed with his views nicknamed him "Eric Severalsides." Sevareid recognized his own biases, which caused some to disagree with him vehemently. He said that as he had grown older, he had tended to become more conservative in foreign policy and liberal in domestic policy.

His commentary touched on many of the day's important issues. After a 1966 trip to South Vietnam, he commented that prolonging the war would be unwise and that the U.S. would be better off pursuing a negotiated settlement. He also helped keep alive another Murrow tradition at CBS that began with the interview show Person to Person. On Conversations with Eric Sevareid, he interviewed such famous newsmakers as West German Chancellor Willy Brandt and novelist Leo Rosten. In somewhat of a spoof of that tradition, he also had a conversation with King George III, portrayed by Peter Ustinov, titled The Last King in America.

In his final CBS Evening News editorial, on November 30, 1977, Sevareid paid tribute to his colleagues and mentors, noting those who died, including Walter Lippmann and Edward R. Murrow, the latter of whom Sevareid described as "the man who invented me." Sevareid ended his farewell by thanking the American public for their engagement with his work, noting that the work of journalism, in his eyes, involves the "perception of honesty and fair intent."

"There is, in the American people, a tough undiminished instinct for what is fair. Rightly or wrongly, I have the feeling that I have passed that test. I shall wear this like a medal. Millions have listened in agreement and in powerful disagreement. Tens of thousands have written their thoughts to me. I will feel always that I stand in their midst. This was Eric Sevareid in Washington. Thank you and goodbye."

Walter Cronkite ended the broadcast by celebrating Sevareid as, in his view, "one of the finest essayists of the century."

Sevareid later narrated the American history series Between The Wars. In 1981, Sevareid hosted a documentary series on PBS, entitled Enterprise, a profile on how America portrays business. The following year, he hosted the syndicated newsmagazine program Eric Sevareid's Chronicle.

He made a guest appearance as himself in a 1980 episode of the sitcom Taxi and also played himself in the 1983 space flight film The Right Stuff.

== Personal life ==
Sevareid married the former Lois Finger. They had twin sons, Peter and Michael, born in Paris while Sevareid was stationed there as a war correspondent for CBS. In 1946 they were among the founders of Burgundy Farm Country Day school in Alexandria, Virginia, the first integrated school in the state.

Sevareid's second marriage was to Belen Marshall. They had a daughter, Cristina, born in New York while he was working as a commentator at the New York bureau. His third marriage was to Suzanne St. Pierre, a CBS producer. [See Washington Post obituary]

== Death ==
Sevareid died of stomach cancer in Washington, D.C., on July 9, 1992, at age 79.

== Honors ==
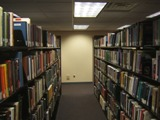
A portion of the Eric Sevareid Library at the University of Minnesota

- 1950, 1964, 1976: Peabody Award
- 1954: Alfred I. duPont Award
- 1964: State of North Dakota Theodore Roosevelt Rough Rider Award
- 1965: Newspaper Guild of New York Page One Award
- 1977: Paul White Award, Radio Television Digital News Association
- Emmy Award nominee:
  - Best News Reporter or Commentator – 1955
  - Best News Commentary – 1958
- 1993: Inducted posthumously into the Scandinavian-American Hall of Fame
- On October 5, 2007, the United States Postal Service announced that it would honor Sevareid and four other journalists of the 20th century with first-class rate postage stamps, to be issued on Tuesday, April 22, 2008. Sevareid's award was in recognition of his World War II reporting and his criticism of Sen. Joseph McCarthy's anti-communism campaign

== See also ==
- Alfred and Clara Sevareid House

== Works ==
- Canoeing with the Cree, 1935, reprinted 1968 ISBN 0-87351-152-2
- Not So Wild a Dream (autobiography), 1946, reissued 1976 ISBN 0-8262-1014-7
- In One Ear: 107 Snapshots of Men and Events which Make a Far-Reaching Panorama of the American Situation at Mid-Century (essays), Knopf, 1952.
- Small Sounds in the Night: A Collection of Capsule Commentaries on the American Scene, Knopf, 1956.
- This is Eric Sevareid (essays), McGraw, 1964.
- (With Robert A. Smith) Washington: Magnificent Capital, Doubleday, 1965.
- (With John Case) Enterprise: The Making of Business in America, McGraw-Hill, 1983.

== Related reading ==
- Raymond A. Schroth (1995) The American Journey of Eric Sevareid (Steerforth Press) ISBN 1-883642-12-4
- T. Harrell Allen (2017) The Voice of Reason: Eric Sevareid's CBS Commentaries (CreateSpace Independent Publishing Platform) ISBN 978-1-5470-2752-1
