= List of people from Lee's Summit, Missouri =

The following is a list of notable Lee's Summiters (people who were either born, raised, or have lived for a significant period of time in Lee's Summit, Missouri).

== Artists ==
- Freddie Williams II (born 1977), comic book artist

== Authors ==
- Terry Garrity (born 1934), author of the New York Times bestseller The Sensuous Woman
- Dennis Hopeless, comic book writer
- Richard Kyanka (1976–2021), creator of popular website Something Awful

== Entertainment ==
- Angela Lindvall (born 1979), model and actress
- Audrey Lindvall (1982–2006), model
- Katherine McNamara (born 1995), actress
- Vanessa Merrell (born 1996), YouTuber, actress, and musician
- Veronica Merrell (born 1996), YouTuber and actress

== Musicians ==
- Mike Metheny (born 1949), jazz musician and journalist
- Pat Metheny (born 1954), Grammy Award-winning jazz musician

== Politicians ==
- Paul Coverdell (1939–2000), United States senator from Georgia
- William S. Cowherd (1860–1915), United States representative from Missouri and mayor of Kansas City, Missouri
- Rick Roeber (born 1955), member of the Missouri House of Representatives expelled in a child abuse investigation
- Sam B. Strother (1871–1929), mayor of Kansas City, Missouri

== Scientists ==
- Robert K. Dixon, Nobel Peace Prize laureate, presidential adviser, and scientist

== Sportspeople ==
- Danielle Adams (born 1989), WNBA forward-center
- Megan Anderson (born 1990), mixed martial artist in the UFC
- Felix Anudike-Uzomah (born 2002), NFL defensive end for the Kansas City Chiefs
- Fred Arbanas (1939–2021), NFL tight end
- Bobby Bell Jr. (born 1962), NFL linebacker
- Evan Boehm (born 1993), NFL center
- Taylor Bowlin (born 1991), soccer player
- Chase Coffman (born 1986), NFL tight end
- Mark Curp (born 1959), former half marathon world record holder
- Forrest Griffith (1928–2007), NFL halfback for the New York Giants
- Matt Hall (born 1993), MLB pitcher
- Monte Harrison (born 1995), MLB center fielder
- Bill Kenney (born 1955), NFL quarterback for the Kansas City Chiefs
- James Krause (born 1986), mixed martial artist in the UFC
- Mandy Laddish (born 1992), NWSL midfielder
- Alex Lange (born 1995), MLB pitcher for the Detroit Tigers
- KC Lightfoot (born 1999), Olympic pole vaulter
- Drew Lock (born 1996), NFL quarterback for the Seattle Seahawks
- Armand Membou (born 2004), NFL offensive tackle for the New York Jets
- Addisyn Merrick (born 1998), soccer player
- Jordan Murray (born 2000), NFL tight end for the Chicago Bears
- Erik Palmer-Brown (born 1997), soccer player
- Darrell Porter (1952–2002), MLB catcher
- Trevor Rosenthal (born 1990), MLB pitcher
- Matt Tegenkamp (born 1982), Olympic long-distance runner
- Mitchell Tinsley (born 1999), NFL wide receiver for the Cincinnati Bengals

== Outlaws ==
- Bob Younger (1853–1889), member of the James–Younger Gang
- Cole Younger (1844–1916), leader of the James–Younger Gang
- Jim Younger (1848–1902), member of the James–Younger Gang
- John Younger (1851–1874), member of the James–Younger Gang
