= 2025 Cincinnati Bengals season =

58th season in franchise history; 56th season in the National Football League

- Owner: Mike Brown
- Head coach: Zac Taylor
- Home stadium: Paycor Stadium

Results
- Record: 6–11
- Division place: 3rd AFC North
- Playoffs: Did not qualify
- All-Pros: WR Ja'Marr Chase (1st team)
- Pro Bowlers: QB Joe Burrow; WR Ja'Marr Chase; WR Tee Higgins; QB Joe Flacco

Uniform
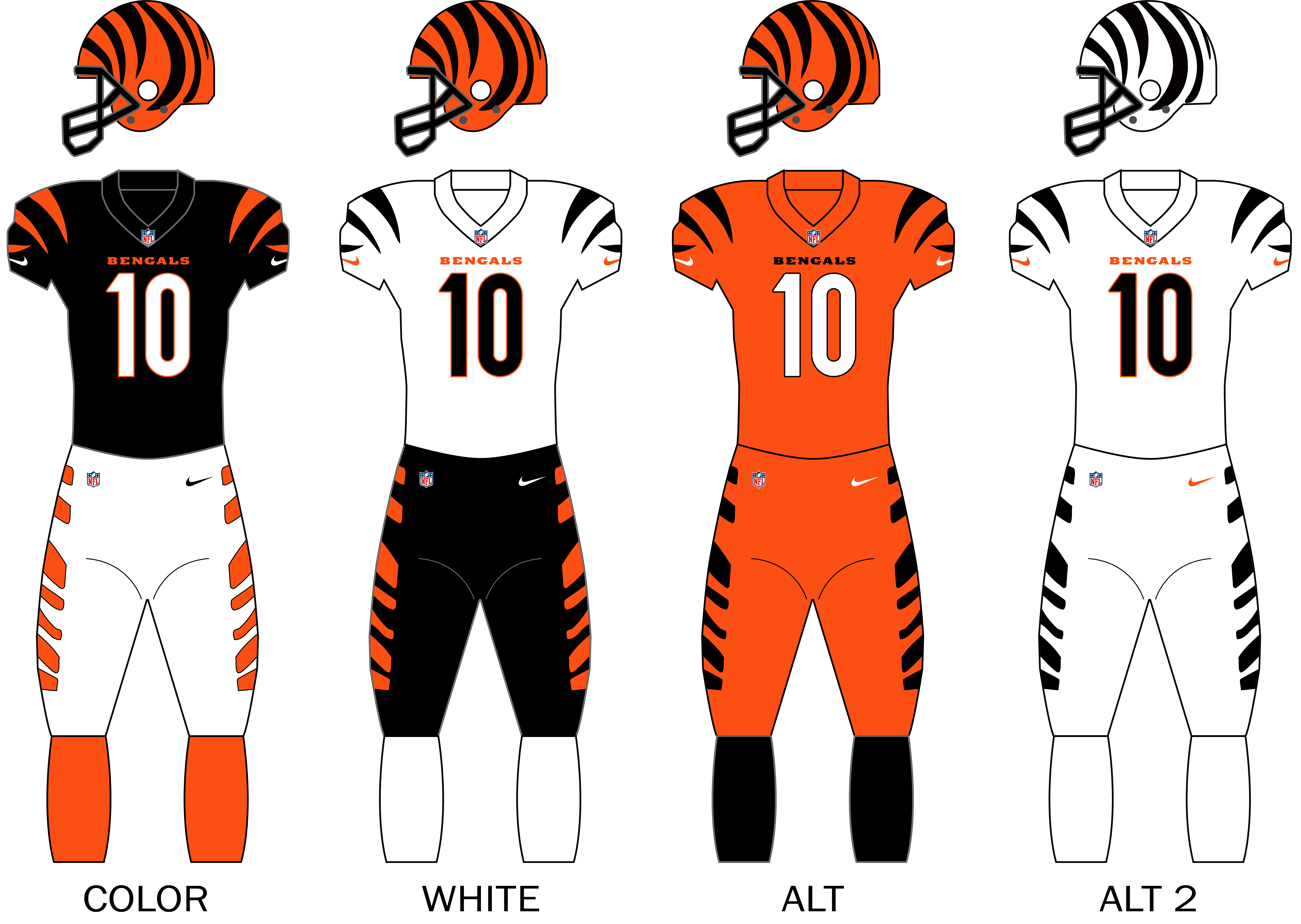

The 2025 season was the Cincinnati Bengals' 56th in the National Football League (NFL), their 58th overall, their 26th playing their home games at Paycor Stadium, and their seventh under head coach Zac Taylor. The Bengals failed to improve on their 9–8 record from the last two seasons following a Week 12 loss to the eventual AFC champion New England Patriots, and instead went 6–11 for their worst season since 2020. Like the previous year, their defense is ranked last at 32nd in most statistical categories. They also missed the playoffs for the third straight year after a week 15 shutout loss to their division rival Baltimore Ravens. The Bengals played on Thanksgiving for the first time since 2010.

Despite a 2–0 start, in Week 2 against the Jacksonville Jaguars, quarterback Joe Burrow suffered a turf toe injury and was put on injured reserve. As such, for the third time in Burrow’s six years with the team, he could not start for much of the regular season; the Bengals went 1–8 without him. Burrow returned as the starting quarterback in Week 13 on Thanksgiving night, in a 32–14 upset win over the Ravens. The Bengals started 4–8 for the second straight year. After a loss to the Buffalo Bills, the Bengals fell to 4–9, guaranteeing their first losing record since 2020. This season was also Joe Flacco's first season making the Pro Bowl games.

== Offseason ==
=== Free agents ===
As of August 1, 2025

Below are players whose contracts with the team expired after the 2024 season.

Position	Player	Tag	2025 Team	Notes
LS	Cal Adomitis	RFA	Cincinnati Bengals	1 year, $1.1 million
LB	Joe Bachie	UFA	Indianapolis Colts	1 year, $1.17 million
S	Vonn Bell	UFA		
T	Trent Brown	UFA	Houston Texans	1 year, $3 million
LB	Akeem Davis-Gaither	UFA	Arizona Cardinals	2 years, $10 million
RB	Chris Evans	UFA		
T	Cody Ford	UFA	Cincinnati Bengals	2 years, $6 million
TE	Mike Gesicki	UFA	Cincinnati Bengals	3 years, $25.5 million
RB	Khalil Herbert	UFA	Indianapolis Colts	1 year, $1.337 million
WR	Tee Higgins	UFA	Cincinnati Bengals	4 years, $115 million
DT	B.J. Hill	UFA	Cincinnati Bengals	3 years, $33 million
CB	Mike Hilton	UFA	Miami Dolphins	TBA
TE	Tanner Hudson	UFA	Cincinnati Bengals	1 year, $1.2 million
G	Jaxson Kirkland	ERFA	Cincinnati Bengals	1 year, $960k
DE	Joseph Ossai	UFA	Cincinnati Bengals	1 year, $6.5 million
P	Ryan Rehkow	ERFA	Cincinnati Bengals	2 years, $2.035 million
DE	Cameron Sample	UFA	Cincinnati Bengals	1 year, $1.225 million
T	D'Ante Smith	UFA		
DT	Jay Tufele	UFA	New York Jets	1 year, $1.17 million
RB	Trayveon Williams	UFA	New England Patriots	1 year, $1.17 million
CB	Marco Wilson	UFA	Cincinnati Bengals	1 year, $1.5 million
QB	Logan Woodside	UFA	Cincinnati Bengals	1 year, $1.17 million
K	Cade York	ERFA		

=== Signings ===
Position	Player	2024 Team	Date signed	Contract
RB	Samaje Perine	Kansas City Chiefs	March 13	2 years, $3.6 million
DT	Tedarrell Slaton	Green Bay Packers	March 13	2 years, $14.1 million
LB	Oren Burks	Philadelphia Eagles	March 17	2 years, $5 million
G	Lucas Patrick	New Orleans Saints	March 21	1 year, $2.1 million
LB	Joe Giles-Harris	Jacksonville Jaguars	April 9	1 year, $1.1 million
TE	Noah Fant	Seattle Seahawks	July 21	1 year, $2.75 million

=== Extensions ===
Below are players who are under contract through 2025 and received a contract extension.

Position	Player	Date signed	Notes
WR	Ja'Marr Chase	March 17	4 years, $161 million

=== Releases ===
Position	Player	Date released	2025 Team
DT	Sheldon Rankins	February 21	Houston Texans
G	Alex Cappa	March 3	Las Vegas Raiders
LB	Germaine Pratt	June 9	Las Vegas Raiders
RB	Zack Moss	July 30	

=== Retirements ===
Position	Player	Date Retired
DE	Sam Hubbard	March 5

== Draft ==
2025 Cincinnati Bengals draft selections
Round	Selection	Player	Position	College	Notes
1	17	Shemar Stewart	DE	Texas A&M	
2	49	Demetrius Knight	LB	South Carolina	
3	81	Dylan Fairchild	G	Georgia	
4	119	Barrett Carter	LB	Clemson	
5	153	Jalen Rivers	G	Miami	
6	193	Tahj Brooks	RB	Texas Tech	
7	233	Traded to the Chicago Bears (Note: The Bengals traded a seventh-round selection (233rd overall) to the Chicago Bears in exchange for RB Khalil Herbert.)			

=== Undrafted free agents ===
2025 Cincinnati Bengals draft selections
Name	Position	College	Ref.
Quali Conley	RB	Arizona	
Eric Gregory	DT	Arkansas	
Payton Thorne	QB	Auburn	
Caleb Etienne	OT	BYU	
Jamoi Mayes	WR	Cincinnati	
Jordan Moore	WR	Duke	
Dante Barnett	DT	IPP	
William Wagner	LS	Michigan	
Howard Cross III	DT	Notre Dame	
Seth McLaughlin	C	Ohio State	
Rashod Owens	WR	Oklahoma State	
Shaquan Loyal	SS	Rutgers	
Bralyn Lux	CB	Texas Tech	
Kole Taylor	TE	West Virginia	

Draft trades

== Staff ==
2025 Cincinnati Bengals staff
Front office: Owner/president – Mike Brown; Executive vice president – Katie Blackburn; Vice president – Troy Blackburn; Vice president of player personnel – Paul H. Brown; Director of player personnel – Duke Tobin; Assistant general manager – Trey Brown; Assistant general manager – Mike Potts; Assistant general manager – Steven Radicivec; Director of football research – Sam Francis; Head coaches: Head coach – Zac Taylor; Assistant head coach/special teams coordinator – Darrin Simmons; Offensive coaches: Offensive coordinator – Dan Pitcher; Passing game coordinator – Justin Rascati; Quarterbacks – Brad Kragthorpe; Assistant quarterbacks – Fredi Knighten; Running backs – Justin Hill; Wide receivers – Troy Walters; Assistant wide receivers – Jordan Salkin; Tight ends – James Casey; Offensive line – Scott Peters; Assistant offensive line – Michael McCarthy	Defensive coaches: Defensive coordinator – Al Golden; Defensive line/run game coordinator – Jerry Montgomery; Linebackers – Michael Hodges; Secondary/cornerbacks – Charles Burks; Secondary/safeties – Jordan Kovacs; Senior defensive assistant – Sean Desai; Defensive assistant – Ronnie Regula; Defensive assistant – Mike Moon; Special teams coaches: Assistant special teams – Ben Jacobs; Strength and conditioning: Strength and conditioning – Joey Boese; Assistant strength and conditioning – Todd Hunt; Assistant strength and conditioning – Garrett Swanson

== Final roster ==
2025 Cincinnati Bengals roster
Quarterbacks (QB): 6 Jake Browning; 9 Joe Burrow; 16 Joe Flacco; Running backs (RB): 25 Tahj Brooks; 30 Chase Brown; 34 Samaje Perine; Wide receivers (WR): 1 Ja'Marr Chase; 5 Tee Higgins; 80 Andrei Iosivas; 15 Charlie Jones; 82 Mitchell Tinsley; 12 Ke'Shawn Williams; Tight ends (TE): 86 Noah Fant; 88 Mike Gesicki; 85 Cam Grandy; 87 Tanner Hudson; 89 Drew Sample	Offensive linemen (OL): 75 Orlando Brown T; 63 Dylan Fairchild G; 61 Cody Ford T; 64 Ted Karras C; 71 Amarius Mims T; 62 Lucas Patrick G/C; 66 Dalton Risner G; 74 Jalen Rivers G; Defensive linemen (DL): 51 Isaiah Foskey DE; 92 B. J. Hill DT; 93 McKinnley Jackson DT; 94 Jordan Jefferson DT; 52 Cedric Johnson DE; 99 Myles Murphy DE; 58 Joseph Ossai DE; 96 Cameron Sample DE; 98 Tedarrell Slaton DT; 97 Shemar Stewart DE	Linebackers (LB): 42 Oren Burks OLB; 49 Barrett Carter OLB; 43 Joe Giles-Harris OLB; 50 Shaka Heyward MLB; 44 Demetrius Knight MLB; Defensive backs (DB): 26 Tycen Anderson FS; 33 Daijahn Anthony SS; 27 Jordan Battle SS; 35 Jalen Davis CB; 23 Daxton Hill CB; 38 D. J. Ivey CB; 37 P. J. Jules SS; 28 Josh Newton CB; 22 Geno Stone FS; 20 DJ Turner CB; Special teams (ST): 2 Evan McPherson K; 8 Ryan Rehkow P; 46 William Wagner LS	Practice squad: 45 Liam Anderson OLB; 69 Jacob Bayer C; 32 Gary Brightwell RB; 4 Sean Clifford QB; 79 Andrew Coker T; 95 Howard Cross III DT; 73 Javon Foster T; 18 Xavier Johnson WR; 40 Jalen Kimber CB; 60 Jaxson Kirkland G (PS/I); 21 Bralyn Lux CB; 68 Seth McLaughlin C; 36 Kendall Milton RB; 14 Jordan Moore WR; 56 Antwaun Powell-Ryland OLB; 19 Kendric Pryor WR; 39 Russ Yeast FS; Reserve: 83 Erick All TE (PUP); 53 Brian Asamoah OLB (IR); 91 Trey Hendrickson DE (IR); 90 Kris Jenkins Jr. DT (IR); 65 Matt Lee C (IR/DFR); 29 Cam Taylor-Britt CB (IR); 67 Cordell Volson G (IR); 24 Marco Wilson CB (IR); Rookies in italics 53 active, 8 reserve, 16 practice squad (1 exempt)

== Preseason ==
The Bengals' preseason opponents and schedule was announced in May, in conjunction with the release of the regular season schedule.

Week	Date	Opponent	Result	Record	Venue	Recap
1	August 7	at Philadelphia Eagles	L 27–34	0–1	Lincoln Financial Field	Recap
2	August 18	at Washington Commanders	W 31–17	1–1	Northwest Stadium	Recap
3	August 23	Indianapolis Colts	L 14–41	1–2	Paycor Stadium	Recap

== Regular season ==
=== Schedule ===
Week	Date	Opponent	Result	Record	Venue	Recap
1	September 7	at **Cleveland Browns**	**W** 17–16	1–0	Huntington Bank Field	Recap
2	September 14	Jacksonville Jaguars	**W** 31–27	2–0	Paycor Stadium	Recap
3	September 21	at Minnesota Vikings	**L** 10–48	2–1	U.S. Bank Stadium	Recap
4	September 29	at Denver Broncos	**L** 3–28	2–2	Empower Field at Mile High	Recap
5	October 5	Detroit Lions	**L** 24–37	2–3	Paycor Stadium	Recap
6	October 12	at Green Bay Packers	**L** 18–27	2–4	Lambeau Field	Recap
7	October 16	**Pittsburgh Steelers**	**W** 33–31	3–4	Paycor Stadium	Recap
8	October 26	New York Jets	**L** 38–39	3–5	Paycor Stadium	Recap
9	November 2	Chicago Bears	**L** 42–47	3–6	Paycor Stadium	Recap
10	Bye					
11	November 16	at **Pittsburgh Steelers**	**L** 12–34	3–7	Acrisure Stadium	Recap
12	November 23	New England Patriots	**L** 20–26	3–8	Paycor Stadium	Recap
13	November 27	at **Baltimore Ravens**	**W** 32–14	4–8	M&T Bank Stadium	Recap
14	December 7	at Buffalo Bills	**L** 34–39	4–9	Highmark Stadium	Recap
15	December 14	**Baltimore Ravens**	**L** 0–24	4–10	Paycor Stadium	Recap
16	December 21	at Miami Dolphins	**W** 45–21	5–10	Hard Rock Stadium	Recap
17	December 28	Arizona Cardinals	**W** 37–14	6–10	Paycor Stadium	Recap
18	January 4	**Cleveland Browns**	**L** 18–20	6–11	Paycor Stadium	Recap

Note: Intra-division opponents are in bold text.

=== Game summaries ===
==== Week 1: at Cleveland Browns ====
Week 1: Cincinnati Bengals at Cleveland Browns – Game summary

Quarter	1	2	3	4	Total
**Bengals**	7	7	3	0	**17**
Browns	0	10	6	0	**16**

at Huntington Bank Field, Cleveland, Ohio

- Date: September 7
- Game time: 1:00 p.m. EDT
- Game weather: Sunny, 63 °F (17 °C)
- Game attendance: 65,599
- Referee: Adrian Hill
- TV announcers (Fox): Kevin Kugler, Daryl Johnston and Allison Williams
- Recap, Game Book

Game information

**First quarter**

- CIN – Chase Brown 5-yard run (Evan McPherson kick), 7:32. Bengals 7–0. **Drive: 12 plays, 68 yards, 7:28.**

**Second quarter**

- CLE – Raheim Sanders 1-yard run (Andre Szmyt kick), 12:42. Tied 7–7. **Drive: 16 plays, 67 yards, 9:50.**
- CIN – Noah Fant 1-yard pass from Joe Burrow (Evan McPherson kick), 4:18. Bengals 14–7. **Drive: 8 plays, 54 yards, 4:13.**
- CLE – Andre Szmyt 45-yard field goal, 0:23. Bengals 14–10. **Drive: 11 plays, 51 yards, 3:55.**

**Third quarter**

- CLE – Cedric Tillman 5-yard pass from Joe Flacco (kick failed), 7:20. Browns 16–14. **Drive: 13 plays, 69 yards, 7:40.**
- CIN – Evan McPherson 35-yard field goal, 2:48. Bengals 17–16. **Drive: 7 plays, 17 yards, 2:05.**

**Fourth quarter**

- No scoring plays.

**Top passers**

- CIN – Joe Burrow – 14/23, 113 yards, TD
- CLE – Joe Flacco – 31/45, 290 yards, TD, 2 INT

**Top rushers**

- CIN – Chase Brown – 21 rushes, 43 yards, TD
- CLE – Dylan Sampson – 12 rushes, 29 yards

**Top receivers**

- CIN – Tee Higgins – 3 receptions, 33 yards
- CLE – Jerry Jeudy – 5 receptions, 66 yards

With the win, the Bengals won their first Week 1 game since 2021.

==== Week 2: vs. Jacksonville Jaguars ====
Week 2: Jacksonville Jaguars at Cincinnati Bengals – Game summary

Quarter	1	2	3	4	Total
Jaguars	7	10	7	3	**27**
**Bengals**	7	3	14	7	**31**

at Paycor Stadium, Cincinnati, Ohio

- Date: September 14
- Game time: 1:00 p.m. EDT
- Game weather: Partly sunny, 84 °F (29 °C)
- Game attendance: 65,871
- Referee: Alan Eck
- TV announcers (CBS): Chris Lewis, Logan Ryan and Tiffany Blackmon
- Recap, Game Book

Game information

**First quarter**

- JAX – Dyami Brown 9-yard pass from Trevor Lawrence (Cam Little kick), 10:51. Jaguars 7–0. **Drive: 9 plays, 69 yards, 4:09.**
- CIN – Ja'Marr Chase 4-yard pass from Joe Burrow (Evan McPherson kick), 0:07. Tied 7–7. **Drive: 11 plays, 80 yards, 4:45.**

**Second quarter**

- JAX – Bhayshul Tuten 8-yard pass from Trevor Lawrence (Cam Little kick), 10:54. Jaguars 14–7. **Drive: 8 plays, 75 yards, 4:13.**
- CIN – Evan McPherson 31-yard field goal, 3:28. Jaguars 17–7. **Drive: 7 plays, 17 yards, 3:36.**
- JAX – Cam Little 42-yard field goal, 1:35. Jaguars 17–10. **Drive: 7 plays, 41 yards, 1:53.**

**Third quarter**

- CIN – Mitchell Tinsley 13-yard pass from Jake Browning (Evan McPherson kick), 11:05. Tied 17–17. **Drive: 7 plays, 76 yards, 3:55.**
- JAX – Travis Etienne 11-yard pass from Trevor Lawrence (Cam Little kick), 4:08. Jaguars 24–17. **Drive: 5 plays, 30 yards, 3:02.**
- CIN – Tee Higgins 42-yard pass from Jake Browning (Evan McPherson kick), 2:39. Tied 24–24. **Drive: 3 plays, 47 yards, 1:29.**

**Fourth quarter**

- JAX – Cam Little 25-yard field goal, 11:43. Jaguars 27–24. **Drive: 13 plays, 68 yards, 5:56.**
- CIN – Jake Browning 1-yard run (Evan McPherson kick), 0:18. Bengals 31–27. **Drive: 15 plays, 92 yards, 3:24.**

**Top passers**

- JAX – Trevor Lawrence – 24/42, 271 yards, 3 TD, 2 INT
- CIN – Jake Browning – 21/32, 241 yards, 2 TD, 3 INT

**Top rushers**

- JAX – Travis Etienne – 14 rushes, 71 yards
- CIN – Chase Brown – 16 rushes, 47 yards

**Top receivers**

- JAX – Parker Washington – 5 receptions, 76 yards
- CIN – Ja'Marr Chase – 14 receptions, 165 yards, TD

With the win, the Bengals started 2–0 for the first time since 2018. However, the team suffered a major blow as quarterback Joe Burrow suffered a Grade 3 turf toe injury in the second quarter which resulting in him missing the next nine games and required surgery. Backup quarterback Jake Browning stepped in to finish the game, securing the win. Thereafter, Browning was announced as the Bengals' starting quarterback in Burrow's absence, and head coach Zac Taylor said that the team has full confidence in him. Burrow underwent successful turf toe surgery on September 19. He did not return until Thanksgiving against Baltimore in Week 13.

==== Week 3: at Minnesota Vikings ====
Week 3: Cincinnati Bengals at Minnesota Vikings – Game summary

Quarter	1	2	3	4	Total
Bengals	0	3	0	7	**10**
**Vikings**	14	20	14	0	**48**

at U.S. Bank Stadium, Minneapolis, Minnesota

- Date: September 21
- Game time: 1:00 p.m. EDT/12:00 p.m. CDT
- Game weather: None (indoor stadium)
- Game attendance: 66,792
- Referee: Ron Torbert
- TV announcers (CBS): Jim Nantz, Tony Romo and Tracy Wolfson
- Recap, Game Book

Game information

**First quarter**

- MIN – Josh Oliver 12-yard pass from Carson Wentz (Will Reichard kick), 12:57. Vikings 7–0. **Drive: 6 plays, 64 yards, 2:03.**
- MIN – Isaiah Rodgers 87-yard interception return (Will Reichard kick), 6:08. Vikings 14–0.

**Second quarter**

- MIN – Will Reichard 35-yard field goal, 9:20. Vikings 17–0. **Drive: 10 plays, 26 yards, 4:28.**
- CIN – Evan McPherson 45-yard field goal, 4:42. Vikings 17–3. **Drive: 9 plays, 48 yards, 4:38.**
- MIN – Isaiah Rodgers 66-yard fumble recovery (Will Reichard kick), 1:47. Vikings 24–3.
- MIN – Jordan Mason 5-yard run (Will Reichard kick), 0:33. Vikings 31–3. **Drive: 3 plays, 52 yards, 0:48.**
- MIN – Will Reichard 62-yard field goal, 0:00. Vikings 34–3. **Drive: 4 plays, 3 yards, 0:20.**

**Third quarter**

- MIN – Jordan Mason 4-yard run (Will Reichard kick), 6:00. Vikings 41–3. **Drive: 10 plays, 74 yards, 6:42.**
- MIN – T. J. Hockenson 5-yard pass from Carson Wentz (Will Reichard kick), 0:17. Vikings 48–3. **Drive: 6 plays, 68 yards, 3:32.**

**Fourth quarter**

- CIN – Drew Sample 4-yard pass from Jake Browning (Evan McPherson kick), 11:12. Vikings 48–10. **Drive: 7 plays, 65 yards, 4:05.**

**Top passers**

- CIN – Jake Browning – 19/27, 140 yards, TD, 2 INT
- MIN – Carson Wentz – 14/20, 173 yards, 2 TD

**Top rushers**

- CIN – Samaje Perine – 4 rushes, 21 yards
- MIN – Jordan Mason – 16 rushes, 116 yards, 2 TD

**Top receivers**

- CIN – Ja'Marr Chase – 5 receptions, 50 yards
- MIN – Justin Jefferson – 5 receptions, 75 yards

The 38-point margin defeat marked the worst loss in Bengals franchise history. With the horrific loss, Cincinnati fell to 2–1 and 0–1 against the NFC North.

==== Week 4: at Denver Broncos ====
Week 4: Cincinnati Bengals at Denver Broncos – Game summary

Quarter	1	2	3	4	Total
Bengals	3	0	0	0	**3**
**Broncos**	7	14	0	7	**28**

at Empower Field at Mile High, Denver, Colorado

- Date: September 29
- Game time: 8:15 p.m. EDT/6:15 p.m. MDT
- Game weather: Partly cloudy, 65 °F (18 °C)
- Game attendance: 75,673
- Referee: Alex Moore
- TV announcers (ABC): Joe Buck, Troy Aikman, Lisa Salters and Laura Rutledge
- Recap, Game Book

Game information

**First quarter**

- CIN – Evan McPherson 26-yard field goal, 9:08. Bengals 3–0. **Drive: 12 plays, 62 yards, 5:52.**
- DEN – Bo Nix 6-yard run (Wil Lutz kick), 0:17. Broncos 7–3. **Drive: 9 plays, 64 yards, 4:07.**

**Second quarter**

- DEN – Marvin Mims 16-yard run (Wil Lutz kick), 8:48. Broncos 14–3. **Drive: 8 plays, 80 yards, 3:04.**
- DEN – Courtland Sutton 20-yard pass from Bo Nix (Wil Lutz kick), 0:08. Broncos 21–3. **Drive: 9 plays, 80 yards, 1:01.**

**Third quarter**

- No scoring plays

**Fourth quarter**

- DEN – RJ Harvey 12-yard pass from Bo Nix (Wil Lutz kick), 4:58. Broncos 28–3. **Drive: 10 plays, 76 yards, 6:11.**

**Top passers**

- CIN – Jake Browning – 14/25, 125 yards
- DEN – Bo Nix – 29/42, 326 yards, 2 TD, INT

**Top rushers**

- CIN – Chase Brown – 10 rushes, 40 yards
- DEN – J. K. Dobbins – 16 rushes, 101 yards

**Top receivers**

- CIN – Tee Higgins – 3 receptions, 32 yards
- DEN – Courtland Sutton – 5 receptions, 81 yards, TD

With their second straight blowout loss, the Bengals dropped to 2–2.

==== Week 5: vs. Detroit Lions ====
Week 5: Detroit Lions at Cincinnati Bengals – Game summary

Quarter	1	2	3	4	Total
**Lions**	7	7	14	9	**37**
Bengals	0	3	0	21	**24**

at Paycor Stadium, Cincinnati, Ohio

- Date: October 5
- Game time: 4:25 p.m. EDT
- Game weather: Mostly sunny, 84 °F (29 °C)
- Game attendance: 66,115
- Referee: Carl Cheffers
- TV announcers (Fox): Kevin Kugler, Daryl Johnston and Allison Williams
- Recap, Game Book

Game information

**First quarter**

- DET – Sam LaPorta 10-yard pass from Jared Goff (Jake Bates kick), 10:50. Lions 7–0. **Drive: 7 plays, 58 yards, 4:10.**

**Second quarter**

- DET – Brock Wright 3-yard pass from David Montgomery (Jake Bates kick), 12:16. Lions 14–0. **Drive: 5 plays, 17 yards, 2:26.**
- CIN – Evan McPherson 50-yard field goal, 0:00. Lions 14–3. **Drive: 10 plays, 60 yards, 3:47.**

**Third quarter**

- DET – Jahmyr Gibbs 20-yard pass from Jared Goff (Jake Bates kick), 11:25. Lions 21–3. **Drive: 5 plays, 28 yards, 2:43.**
- DET – David Montgomery 8-yard run (Jake Bates kick), 5:43. Lions 28–3. **Drive: 7 plays, 80 yards, 4:10.**

**Fourth quarter**

- CIN – Ja'Marr Chase 15-yard pass from Jake Browning (Evan McPherson kick), 14:51. Lions 28–10. **Drive: 10 plays, 73 yards, 5:52.**
- CIN – Ja'Marr Chase 64-yard pass from Jake Browning (Evan McPherson kick), 10:22. Lions 28–17. **Drive: 4 plays, 70 yards, 2:07.**
- DET – Isaac TeSlaa 12-yard pass from Jared Goff (Jake Bates kick), 5:14. Lions 35–17. **Drive: 8 plays, 68 yards, 5:08.**
- CIN – Tee Higgins 2-yard pass from Jake Browning (Evan McPherson kick), 3:01. Lions 35–24. **Drive: 8 plays, 63 yards, 2:13.**
- DET – Jake Browning sacked by Derrick Barnes for safety, 1:49. Lions 37–24. **Drive: 1 play, -7 yards, 0:05.**

**Top passers**

- DET – Jared Goff – 19/23, 258 yards, 3 TD
- CIN – Jake Browning – 26/40, 251 yards, 3 TD, 3 INT

**Top rushers**

- DET – David Montgomery – 18 rushes, 65 yards, TD
- CIN – Jake Browning – 4 rushes, 31 yards

**Top receivers**

- DET – Amon-Ra St. Brown – 8 receptions, 100 yards
- CIN – Ja'Marr Chase – 6 receptions, 110 yards, 2 TD

With the loss, the Bengals fell to 2–3 and were defeated by the Lions for the first time since the 1992 season, ending a seven-game winning streak against them.

Following the loss, the Bengals released practice quarterback Mike White and acquired quarterback Joe Flacco via a trade with the Browns. Flacco was announced as the new starting quarterback for the Bengals the next day, and Jake Browning returned to a backup quarterback position.

==== Week 6: at Green Bay Packers ====
Week 6: Cincinnati Bengals at Green Bay Packers – Game summary

Quarter	1	2	3	4	Total
Bengals	0	0	7	11	**18**
**Packers**	0	10	0	17	**27**

at Lambeau Field, Green Bay, Wisconsin

- Date: October 12
- Game time: 4:25 p.m. EDT/3:25 p.m. CDT
- Game weather: Sunny, 64 °F (18 °C)
- Game attendance: 78,277
- Referee: Brad Allen
- TV announcers (CBS): Kevin Harlan, Trent Green and Melanie Collins
- Recap, Game Book

Game information

**First quarter**

- No scoring plays

**Second quarter**

- GB – Lucas Havrisik 43-yard field goal, 14:15. Packers 3–0. **Drive: 12 plays, 71 yards, 7:24.**
- GB – Josh Jacobs 3-yard run (Lucas Havrisik kick), 4:05. Packers 10–0. **Drive: 8 plays, 80 yards, 4:07.**

**Third quarter**

- CIN – Tanner Hudson 2-yard pass from Joe Flacco (Evan McPherson kick), 4:46. Packers 10–7. **Drive: 17 plays, 78 yards, 10:14.**

**Fourth quarter**

- GB – Josh Jacobs 14-yard run (Lucas Havrisik kick), 14:56. Packers 17–7. **Drive: 9 plays, 66 yards, 4:50.**
- CIN – Evan McPherson 45-yard field goal, 10:43. Packers 17–10. **Drive: 9 plays, 50 yards, 4:13.**
- GB – Tucker Kraft 19-yard pass from Jordan Love (Lucas Havrisik kick), 7:33. Packers 24–10. **Drive: 6 plays, 62 yards, 3:10.**
- CIN – Ja'Marr Chase 19-yard pass from Joe Flacco (Joe Flacco–Chase Brown pass), 4:11. Packers 24–18. **Drive: 10 plays, 65 yards, 3:22.**
- GB – Lucas Havrisik 39-yard field goal, 1:52. Packers 27–18. **Drive: 7 plays, 41 yards, 2:19.**

**Top passers**

- CIN – Joe Flacco – 29/45, 219 yards, 2 TD
- GB – Jordan Love – 19/26, 259 yards, TD, INT

**Top rushers**

- CIN – Chase Brown – 9 rushes, 42 yards
- GB – Josh Jacobs – 18 rushes, 93 yards, 2 TD

**Top receivers**

- CIN – Ja'Marr Chase – 10 receptions, 94 yards, TD
- GB – Matthew Golden – 3 receptions, 86 yards

Similar to the Packers' Week 3 meeting with the Browns, the Packers were up with a lead at halftime, but Flacco managed to rally to keep closer, except it led to the Packers getting their revenge on a missed 56-yard field goal from McPherson.

With the close loss, the Bengals were handed their fourth straight loss and now sit at 2–4.

==== Week 7: vs. Pittsburgh Steelers ====
Week 7: Pittsburgh Steelers at Cincinnati Bengals – Game summary

Quarter	1	2	3	4	Total
Steelers	7	3	7	14	**31**
**Bengals**	0	17	3	13	**33**

at Paycor Stadium, Cincinnati, Ohio

- Date: October 16
- Game time: 8:15 p.m. EDT
- Game weather: Clear, 60 °F (16 °C)
- Game attendance: 66,569
- Referee: Clay Martin
- TV announcers (WCPO/Prime Video): Al Michaels, Kirk Herbstreit and Kaylee Hartung
- Recap, Game Book

Game information

**First quarter**

- PIT – Jonnu Smith 10-yard pass from Aaron Rodgers (Chris Boswell kick), 10:51. Steelers 7–0. **Drive: 8 plays, 69 yards, 4:09.**

**Second quarter**

- PIT – Chris Boswell 41-yard field goal, 10:26. Steelers 10–0. **Drive: 12 plays, 51 yards, 7:19.**
- CIN – Ja'Marr Chase 8-yard pass from Joe Flacco (Evan McPherson kick), 4:38. Steelers 10–7. **Drive: 10 plays, 72 yards, 5:48.**
- CIN – Tee Higgins 29-yard pass from Joe Flacco (Evan McPherson kick), 2:52. Bengals 14–10. **Drive: 3 plays, 76 yards, 1:33.**
- CIN – Evan McPherson 49-yard field goal, 0:00. Bengals 17–10. **Drive: 6 plays, 39 yards, 0:40.**

**Third quarter**

- CIN – Evan McPherson 23-yard field goal, 7:55. Bengals 20–10. **Drive: 14 plays, 63 yards, 7:05.**
- PIT – Pat Freiermuth 19-yard pass from Aaron Rodgers (Chris Boswell kick), 3:55. Bengals 20–17. **Drive: 9 plays, 61 yards, 4:00.**

**Fourth quarter**

- CIN – Noah Fant 5-yard pass from Joe Flacco (Evan McPherson kick), 14:57. Bengals 27–17. **Drive: 8 plays, 67 yards, 3:58.**
- PIT – Darnell Washington 2-yard pass from Aaron Rodgers (Chris Boswell kick), 11:03. Bengals 27–24. **Drive: 7 plays, 73 yards, 3:54.**
- CIN – Evan McPherson 45-yard field goal, 6:58. Bengals 30–24. **Drive: 9 plays, 53 yards, 4:05.**
- PIT – Pat Freiermuth 68-yard pass from Aaron Rodgers (Chris Boswell kick), 2:21. Steelers 31–30. **Drive: 2 plays, 58 yards, 0:25.**
- CIN – Evan McPherson 36-yard field goal, 0:07. Bengals 33–31. **Drive: 8 plays, 52 yards, 2:14.**

**Top passers**

- PIT – Aaron Rodgers – 23/34, 249 yards, 4 TD, 2 INT
- CIN – Joe Flacco – 31/47, 342 yards, 3 TD

**Top rushers**

- PIT – Jaylen Warren – 16 rushes, 127 yards
- CIN – Chase Brown – 11 rushes, 108 yards

**Top receivers**

- PIT – Pat Freiermuth – 5 receptions, 111 yards, 2 TD
- CIN – Ja'Marr Chase – 16 receptions, 161 yards, TD

Snapping their 4 game losing streak, the Bengals returned home for a Thursday Night Football win against their division rival Pittsburgh Steelers. With the win, the Bengals improved to 3–4, and beat the Steelers at home for the first time since 2021.

==== Week 8: vs. New York Jets ====
Week 8: New York Jets at Cincinnati Bengals – Game summary

Quarter	1	2	3	4	Total
**Jets**	0	13	3	23	**39**
Bengals	10	14	7	7	**38**

at Paycor Stadium, Cincinnati, Ohio

- Date: October 26
- Game time: 1:00 p.m. EDT
- Game weather: Cloudy, 57 °F (14 °C)
- Game attendance: 65,526
- Referee: Scott Novak
- TV announcers (CBS): Spero Dedes, Adam Archuleta and Aditi Kinkhabwala
- Recap, Game Book

Game information

**First quarter**

- CIN – Evan McPherson 26-yard field goal, 10:14. Bengals 3–0. **Drive: 11 plays, 67 yards, 4:46.**
- CIN – Joe Flacco 1-yard run (Evan McPherson kick), 5:35. Bengals 10–0. **Drive: 5 plays, 35 yards, 2:41.**

**Second quarter**

- NYJ – Nick Folk 46-yard field goal, 12:12. Bengals 10–3. **Drive: 7 plays, 46 yards, 4:04.**
- CIN – Tee Higgins 44-yard pass from Joe Flacco (Evan McPherson kick), 10:45. Bengals 17–3. **Drive: 3 plays, 69 yards, 1:27.**
- NYJ – Tyler Johnson 15-yard pass from Justin Fields (Nick Folk kick), 5:18. Bengals 17–10. **Drive: 9 plays, 78 yards, 5:27.**
- CIN – Chase Brown 19-yard pass from Joe Flacco (Evan McPherson kick), 1:15. Bengals 24–10. **Drive: 10 plays, 65 yards, 4:03.**
- NYJ – Nick Folk 25-yard field goal, 0:00. Bengals 24–13. **Drive: 12 plays, 58 yards, 1:15.**

**Third quarter**

- NYJ – Nick Folk 24-yard field goal, 6:12. Bengals 24–16. **Drive: 10 plays, 80 yards, 4:31.**
- CIN – Samaje Perine 32-yard run (Evan McPherson kick), 2:34. Bengals 31–16. **Drive: 8 plays, 65 yards, 3:38.**

**Fourth quarter**

- NYJ – Breece Hall 5-yard run (Justin Fields run), 14:17. Bengals 31–24. **Drive: 6 plays, 66 yards, 3:17.**
- CIN – Chase Brown 1-yard run (Evan McPherson kick), 10:21. Bengals 38–24. **Drive: 7 plays, 73 yards, 3:56.**
- NYJ – Breece Hall 27-yard run (Justin Fields–Isaiah Davis pass), 7:52. Bengals 38–32. **Drive: 5 plays, 60 yards, 2:29.**
- NYJ – Mason Taylor 4-yard pass from Breece Hall (Nick Folk kick), 1:54. Jets 39–38. **Drive: 9 plays, 58 yards, 4:56.**

**Top passers**

- NYJ – Justin Fields – 21/32, 244 yards, TD
- CIN – Joe Flacco – 21/34, 223 yards, 2 TD

**Top rushers**

- NYJ – Breece Hall – 18 rushes, 133 yards, 2 TD
- CIN – Samaje Perine – 9 rushes, 94 yards, TD

**Top receivers**

- NYJ – Tyler Johnson – 3 receptions, 64 yards, TD
- CIN – Ja'Marr Chase – 12 receptions, 91 yards

The Bengals started strong and entered the fourth quarter leading 31–16. After both teams exchanged touchdowns, Cincinnati held a 38–24 lead with 10:21 remaining. However, the Bengals’ defense allowed the Jets to score two unanswered touchdowns, including a touchdown pass from running back Breece Hall to tight end Mason Taylor, giving New York a one-point lead. The Bengals attempted a late comeback but turned the ball over on downs, as the Jets earned their first win of the season and became the last team in the NFL to record a victory. The Bengals’ defense struggled, allowing the Jets to finish with 502 total yards of offense, including 254 rushing yards.

==== Week 9: vs. Chicago Bears ====
Week 9: Chicago Bears at Cincinnati Bengals – Game summary

Quarter	1	2	3	4	Total
**Bears**	7	10	14	16	**47**
Bengals	10	10	7	15	**42**

at Paycor Stadium, Cincinnati, Ohio

- Date: November 2
- Game time: 1:00 p.m. EST
- Game weather: Cloudy, 50 °F (10 °C)
- Game attendance: 66,264
- Referee: Clete Blakeman
- TV announcers (CBS): Spero Dedes, Adam Archuleta and Aditi Kinkhabwala
- Recap, Game Book

Game information

**First quarter**

- CIN – Charlie Jones 98-yard kickoff return (Evan McPherson kick), 14:49. Bengals 7–0.
- CHI – Caleb Williams 2-yard pass from D. J. Moore (Cairo Santos kick), 8:44. Tied 7–7. **Drive: 12 plays, 73 yards, 6:05.**
- CIN – Evan McPherson 41-yard field goal, 5:41. Bengals 10–7. **Drive: 7 plays, 32 yards, 3:03.**

**Second quarter**

- CHI – Olamide Zaccheaus 15-yard pass from Caleb Williams (Cairo Santos kick), 14:54. Bears 14–10. **Drive: 11 plays, 74 yards, 5:47.**
- CIN – Evan McPherson 33-yard field goal, 5:47. Bears 14–13. **Drive: 11 plays, 70 yards, 4:20.**
- CHI – Cairo Santos 24-yard field goal, 1:29. Bears 17–13. **Drive: 11 plays, 59 yards, 4:18.**
- CIN – Tee Higgins 44-yard pass from Joe Flacco (Evan McPherson kick), 1:12. Bengals 20–17. **Drive: 2 plays, 63 yards, 0:17.**

**Third quarter**

- CHI – Colston Loveland 5-yard pass from Caleb Williams (Cairo Santos kick), 8:11. Bears 24–20. **Drive: 12 plays, 77 yards, 6:49.**
- CIN – Tee Higgins 2-yard pass from Joe Flacco (Evan McPherson kick), 5:19. Bengals 27–24. **Drive: 6 plays, 69 yards, 2:52.**
- CHI – Brittain Brown 22-yard run (Cairo Santos kick), 1:57. Bears 31–27. **Drive: 6 plays, 74 yards, 3:22.**

**Fourth quarter**

- CHI – Cairo Santos 36-yard field goal, 12:03. Bears 34–27. **Drive: 5 plays, 20 yards, 2:51.**
- CHI – D. J. Moore 17-yard run (Cairo Santos kick), 4:53. Bears 41–27. **Drive: 2 plays, 56 yards, 1:00.**
- CIN – Noah Fant 23-yard pass from Joe Flacco (Joe Flacco–Tee Higgins pass), 1:43. Bears 41–35. **Drive: 4 plays, 55 yards, 0:32.**
- CIN – Andrei Iosivas 9-yard pass from Joe Flacco (Evan McPherson kick), 0:54. Bengals 42–41. **Drive: 6 plays, 57 yards, 0:49.**
- CHI – Colston Loveland 58-yard pass from Caleb Williams (pass failed), 0:17. Bears 47–42. **Drive: 4 plays, 72 yards, 0:37.**

**Top passers**

- CHI – Caleb Williams – 20/34, 280 yards, 3 TD
- CIN – Joe Flacco – 31/47, 470 yards, 4 TD, 2 INT

**Top rushers**

- CHI – Kyle Monangai – 26 rushes, 176 yards
- CIN – Chase Brown – 11 rushes, 37 yards

**Top receivers**

- CHI – Colston Loveland – 6 receptions, 118 yards, 2 TD
- CIN – Tee Higgins – 7 receptions, 121 yards, 2 TD

After another close battle, the Bears appeared to seal the game when wide receiver D. J. Moore scored a 16-yard touchdown to make it 41–27 with 4:53 remaining. However, Joe Flacco led the Bengals on a four-play touchdown drive that concluded with a 23-yard touchdown pass to Noah Fant with 1:43 left. Tee Higgins then caught a two-point conversion to trim the Bears’ lead to 41–35. The Bengals successfully executed an onside kick that deflected off the leg of Bears linebacker Daniel Hardy and was recovered by Joseph Ossai. With 49 seconds remaining, the Bengals took a one-point lead after Flacco threw a nine-yard touchdown pass to Andrei Iosivas. On the ensuing drive, Bears quarterback Caleb Williams connected with tight ends Colston Loveland for a 58-yard touchdown with 17 seconds left, giving Chicago a 47–42 victory and thwarting the Bengals’ comeback attempt. Despite Flacco throwing for a career-high 470 yards and leading the Bengals to 42 points, Cincinnati’s defense struggled once again, allowing the Bears to accumulate 576 total yards of offense. With yet another defensive collapse, the Bengals suffered their 4th loss to Chicago since 2013 to fall to 3–6 entering their bye week, while also getting swept by the NFC North.

==== Week 11: at Pittsburgh Steelers ====
Week 11: Cincinnati Bengals at Pittsburgh Steelers – Game summary

Quarter	1	2	3	4	Total
Bengals	6	0	3	3	**12**
**Steelers**	7	3	10	14	**34**

at Acrisure Stadium, Pittsburgh, Pennsylvania

- Date: November 16
- Game time: 1:00 p.m. EST
- Game weather: Partly cloudy, 46 °F (8 °C)
- Game attendance: 66,132
- Referee: Bill Vinovich
- TV announcers (CBS): Kevin Harlan, Trent Green and Melanie Collins
- Recap, Game Book

Game information

**First quarter**

- PIT – Kenneth Gainwell 11-yard pass from Aaron Rodgers (Chris Boswell kick), 10:12. Steelers 7–0. **Drive: 8 plays, 78 yards, 4:48.**
- CIN – Tee Higgins 28-yard pass from Joe Flacco (run failed), 5:10. Steelers 7–6. **Drive: 9 plays, 71 yards, 5:02.**

**Second quarter**

- PIT – Chris Boswell 25-yard field goal, 0:25. Steelers 10–6. **Drive: 9 plays, 86 yards, 1:41.**

**Third quarter**

- CIN – Evan McPherson 43-yard field goal, 11:53. Steelers 10–9. **Drive: 7 plays, 51 yards, 3:07.**
- PIT – Chris Boswell 30-yard field goal, 4:16. Steelers 13–9. **Drive: 15 plays, 61 yards, 7:37.**
- PIT – Kyle Dugger 73-yard interception return (Chris Boswell kick), 0:37. Steelers 20–9.

**Fourth quarter**

- CIN – Evan McPherson 48-yard field goal, 9:41. Steelers 20–12. **Drive: 12 plays, 47 yards, 5:56.**
- PIT – Kenneth Gainwell 5-yard pass from Mason Rudolph (Chris Boswell kick), 3:40. Steelers 27–12. **Drive: 12 plays, 65 yards, 6:01.**
- PIT – James Pierre 34-yard fumble recovery (Chris Boswell kick), 3:22. Steelers 34–12.

**Top passers**

- CIN – Joe Flacco – 23/40, 199 yards, TD, INT
- PIT – Mason Rudolph – 12/16, 127 yards, TD

**Top rushers**

- CIN – Chase Brown – 18 rushes, 99 yards
- PIT – Jaylen Warren – 10 rushes, 62 yards

**Top receivers**

- CIN – Tee Higgins – 3 receptions, 63 yards, TD
- PIT – Kenneth Gainwell – 7 receptions, 81 yards, 2 TD

With a sluggish performance, the Bengals fell to 3–7 and 2–1 against the AFC North.

During the game, Ja’Marr Chase reportedly spat on Steelers cornerback Jalen Ramsey, who retaliated by punching him and was ejected shortly afterward. Chase denied spitting on Ramsey, and the following day, he was suspended for one game. Chase attempted to appeal his suspension, but the NFL denied his appeal. Ramsey was later fined $14,491 for punching Chase. Chase later apologized after the incident.

==== Week 12: vs. New England Patriots ====
Week 12: New England Patriots at Cincinnati Bengals – Game summary

Quarter	1	2	3	4	Total
**Patriots**	0	17	3	6	**26**
Bengals	3	10	0	7	**20**

at Paycor Stadium, Cincinnati, Ohio

- Date: November 23
- Game time: 1:00 p.m. EST
- Game weather: Sunny, 54 °F (12 °C)
- Game attendance: 65,659
- Referee: Land Clark
- TV announcers (CBS): Kevin Harlan, Trent Green and Melanie Collins
- Recap, Game Book

Game information

**First quarter**

- CIN – Evan McPherson 54-yard field goal, 6:36. Bengals 3–0. **Drive: 11 plays, 46 yards, 5:15.**

**Second quarter**

- CIN – Geno Stone 32-yard interception return (Evan McPherson kick), 14:19. Bengals 10–0.
- NE – Hunter Henry 28-yard pass from Drake Maye (Andres Borregales kick), 9:36. Bengals 10–7. **Drive: 9 plays, 70 yards, 4:43.**
- NE – Marcus Jones 33-yard interception return (Andres Borregales kick), 7:42. Patriots 14–10.
- NE – Andres Borregales 41-yard field goal, 0:28. Patriots 17–10. **Drive: 9 plays, 67 yards, 3:50.**
- CIN – Evan McPherson 63-yard field goal, 0:00. Patriots 17–13. **Drive: 3 plays, 37 yards, 0:28.**

**Third quarter**

- NE – Andres Borregales 45-yard field goal, 1:04. Patriots 20–13. **Drive: 8 plays, 49 yards, 3:54.**

**Fourth quarter**

- NE – Andres Borregales 19-yard field goal, 5:55. Patriots 23–13. **Drive: 13 plays, 79 yards, 7:06.**
- CIN – Mitchell Tinsley 17-yard pass from Joe Flacco (Evan McPherson kick), 4:40. Patriots 23–20. **Drive: 4 plays, 71 yards, 1:15.**
- NE – Andres Borregales 52-yard field goal, 1:51. Patriots 26–20. **Drive: 9 plays, 27 yards, 2:49.**

**Top passers**

- NE – Drake Maye – 22/35, 294 yards, TD, INT
- CIN – Joe Flacco – 19/37, 183 yards, TD, INT

**Top rushers**

- NE – TreVeyon Henderson – 18 rushes, 66 yards
- CIN – Chase Brown – 19 rushes, 107 yards

**Top receivers**

- NE – Hunter Henry – 7 receptions, 115 yards, TD
- CIN – Andrei Iosivas – 4 receptions, 61 yards

On the final play of the opening half, Bengals kicker Evan McPherson converted a 63-yard field goal, setting a new Bengals franchise record for the longest field goal. It wouldn't be enough for the Bengals to avoid their second straight loss to the Patriots, which dropped them to 3–8 and 0–2 against the AFC East.

==== Week 13: at Baltimore Ravens ====
Thanksgiving Day games

Week 13: Cincinnati Bengals at Baltimore Ravens – Game summary

Quarter	1	2	3	4	Total
**Bengals**	3	9	14	6	**32**
Ravens	7	0	7	0	**14**

at M&T Bank Stadium, Baltimore, Maryland

- Date: November 27
- Game time: 8:20 p.m. EST
- Game weather: Clear, 38 °F (3 °C)
- Game attendance: 70,066
- Referee: Craig Wrolstad
- TV announcers (NBC): Mike Tirico, Jason Garrett and Melissa Stark
- Recap, Game Book

Game information

**First quarter**

- CIN – Evan McPherson 31-yard field goal, 9:39. Bengals 3–0. **Drive: 10 plays, 51 yards, 5:21.**
- BAL – Derrick Henry 28-yard run (Tyler Loop kick), 6:33. Ravens 7–3. **Drive: 7 plays, 69 yards, 3:06.**

**Second quarter**

- CIN – Evan McPherson 42-yard field goal, 11:24. Ravens 7–6. **Drive: 11 plays, 29 yards, 5:09.**
- CIN – Evan McPherson 24-yard field goal, 2:36. Bengals 9–7. **Drive: 11 plays, 74 yards, 5:46.**
- CIN – Evan McPherson 33-yard field goal, 0:10. Bengals 12–7. **Drive: 4 plays, 4 yards, 0:18.**

**Third quarter**

- CIN – Tanner Hudson 14-yard pass from Joe Burrow (Evan McPherson kick), 7:22. Bengals 19–7. **Drive: 10 plays, 61 yards, 5:26.**
- BAL – Keaton Mitchell 18-yard run (Tyler Loop kick), 3:59. Bengals 19–14. **Drive: 7 plays, 68 yards, 3:23.**
- CIN – Andrei Iosivas 29-yard pass from Joe Burrow (Evan McPherson kick), 0:15. Bengals 26–14. **Drive: 8 plays, 68 yards, 3:44.**

**Fourth quarter**

- CIN – Evan McPherson 52-yard field goal, 9:25. Bengals 29–14. **Drive: 47 plays, 19 yards, 3:29.**
- CIN – Evan McPherson 41-yard field goal, 1:06. Bengals 32–14. **Drive: 6 plays, 13 yards, 3:06.**

**Top passers**

- CIN – Joe Burrow – 24/46, 261 yards, 2 TD
- BAL – Lamar Jackson – 17/32, 246 yards, INT

**Top rushers**

- CIN – Chase Brown – 15 rushes, 78 yards
- BAL – Derrick Henry – 10 rushes, 60 yards, TD

**Top receivers**

- CIN – Ja'Marr Chase – 7 receptions, 110 yards
- BAL – Isaiah Likely – 5 receptions, 95 yards

This was Cincinnati's first game on Thanksgiving since 2010. It was also announced that Joe Burrow would likely return sooner after his turf toe injury in Week 2 and play on Thanksgiving night. Joe Burrow later confirmed that he would start on Thanksgiving night. With Burrow's return now official, Joe Flacco went to a backup quarterback position. Burrow completed 24-of-46 pass attempts for 261 yards and two touchdowns. Ja'Marr Chase, returning from a one-game suspension, recorded seven receptions for 110 yards. Evan McPherson also recorded six field goals, the most in his career, and tied for the second-most in Bengals history. The Ravens committed four fumbles, including two by quarterback Lamar Jackson, all of which contributed to a Bengals victory. With the win, the Bengals improved to 4–8 (3–1 against the AFC North) and won on Thanksgiving for the first time in franchise history.

The game was also the most-watched Thanksgiving night game in NFL history with an average of 28.4 million viewers across NBC, Peacock, and Telemundo.

==== Week 14: at Buffalo Bills ====
Week 14: Cincinnati Bengals at Buffalo Bills – Game summary

Quarter	1	2	3	4	Total
Bengals	7	14	0	13	**34**
**Bills**	3	8	7	21	**39**

at Highmark Stadium, Orchard Park, New York

- Date: December 7
- Game time: 1:00 p.m. EST
- Game weather: Snow, 31 °F (−1 °C)
- Game attendance: 70,613
- Referee: Brad Rogers
- TV announcers (Fox): Joe Davis, Greg Olsen and Pam Oliver
- Recap, Game Book

Game information

**First quarter**

- CIN – Chase Brown 5-yard run (Evan McPherson kick), 6:44. Bengals 7–0. **Drive: 14 plays, 67 yards, 8:16.**
- BUF – Matt Prater 26-yard field goal, 1:54. Bengals 7–3. **Drive: 8 plays, 69 yards, 4:50.**

**Second quarter**

- CIN – Tee Higgins 21-yard pass from Joe Burrow (Evan McPherson kick), 13:33. Bengals 14–3. **Drive: 6 plays, 55 yards, 3:21.**
- BUF – Khalil Shakir 11-yard pass from Josh Allen (Josh Allen–Dawson Knox pass), 7:27. Bengals 14–11. **Drive: 12 plays, 70 yards, 6:06.**
- CIN – Chase Brown 10-yard pass from Joe Burrow (Evan McPherson kick), 3:18. Bengals 21–11. **Drive: 8 plays, 69 yards, 4:09.**

**Third quarter**

- BUF – Dalton Kincaid 5-yard pass from Josh Allen (Matt Prater kick), 9:20. Bengals 21–18. **Drive: 9 plays, 75 yards, 5:40.**

**Fourth quarter**

- CIN – Mike Gesicki 12-yard pass from Joe Burrow (Evan McPherson kick), 8:44. Bengals 28–18. **Drive: 12 plays, 80 yards, 7:02.**
- BUF – Josh Allen 40-yard run (Matt Prater kick), 7:33. Bengals 28–25. **Drive: 4 plays, 68 yards, 1:11.**
- BUF – Christian Benford 63-yard interception return (Matt Prater kick), 5:25. Bills 32–28.
- BUF – Jackson Hawes 3-yard pass from Josh Allen (Matt Prater kick), 3:03. Bills 39–28. **Drive: 5 plays, 29 yards, 2:08.**
- CIN – Tee Higgins 25-yard pass from Joe Burrow (pass failed), 2:13. Bills 39–34. **Drive: 4 plays, 66 yards, 0:50.**

**Top passers**

- CIN – Joe Burrow – 25/36, 284 yards, 4 TD, 2 INT
- BUF – Josh Allen – 22/28, 251 yards, 3 TD

**Top rushers**

- CIN – Samaje Perine – 6 rushes, 31 yards
- BUF – James Cook – 18 rushes, 80 yards

**Top receivers**

- CIN – Tee Higgins – 6 receptions, 92 yards, 2 TD
- BUF – Dawson Knox – 6 receptions, 93 yards

Although the Bengals held a 28–18 lead in the fourth quarter with 8:44 remaining, two interceptions thrown by Burrow ultimately doomed the team. The first was a pick-six returned by Bills cornerback Christian Benford, and the second set up a Bills touchdown that gave Buffalo a lead they never relinquished, resulting in a Bengals loss.

With the loss, the Bengals were guaranteed to finish with a losing record for the first time since 2020.

Despite the loss, one of the few bright spots for the Bengals was when Ja'Marr Chase reached 1,000 receiving yards in each of the first five seasons of his career, becoming the fifth player in NFL history to do so.

==== Week 15: vs. Baltimore Ravens ====
Week 15: Baltimore Ravens at Cincinnati Bengals – Game summary

Quarter	1	2	3	4	Total
**Ravens**	0	14	3	7	**24**
Bengals	0	0	0	0	**0**

at Paycor Stadium, Cincinnati, Ohio

- Date: December 14
- Game time: 1:00 p.m. EST
- Game weather: Sunny, 10 °F (−12 °C)
- Game attendance: 64,907
- Referee: Brad Allen
- TV announcers (CBS): Spero Dedes, Adam Archuleta and Aditi Kinkhabwala
- Recap, Game Book

Game information

**First quarter**

- No scoring plays

**Second quarter**

- BAL – Rasheen Ali 30-yard pass from Lamar Jackson (Tyler Loop kick), 4:35. Ravens 7–0. **Drive: 5 plays, 79 yards, 2:59.**
- BAL – Zay Flowers 28-yard pass from Lamar Jackson (Tyler Loop kick), 0:23. Ravens 14–0. **Drive: 5 plays, 80 yards, 0:42.**

**Third quarter**

- BAL – Tyler Loop 27-yard field goal, 9:05. Ravens 17–0. **Drive: 6 plays, 60 yards, 2:44.**

**Fourth quarter**

- BAL – Alohi Gilman lateral pass from Kyle Van Noy for 84 yard interception return (Tyler Loop kick), 7:38. Ravens 24–0.

**Top passers**

- BAL – Lamar Jackson – 8/12, 150 yards, 2 TD, INT
- CIN – Joe Burrow – 25/39, 225 yards, 2 INT

**Top rushers**

- BAL – Derrick Henry – 11 rushes, 100 yards
- CIN – Chase Brown – 13 rushes, 53 yards

**Top receivers**

- BAL – Zay Flowers – 3 receptions, 68 yards, TD
- CIN – Ja'Marr Chase – 10 receptions, 132 yards

With the loss, the Bengals dropped to 4–10. This was Cincinnati's first home game with Joe Burrow back as starting quarterback since his turf toe injury in Week 2. Burrow and the offense struggled throughout the game, as the Bengals recorded their first shutout loss since losing 20–0 in the 2017 season opener, which coincidentally, was also at home against the Ravens. Burrow was shut out for the first time in his six-year career. Also with the loss, the Bengals were eliminated from playoff contention.

==== Week 16: at Miami Dolphins ====
Week 16: Cincinnati Bengals at Miami Dolphins – Game summary

Quarter	1	2	3	4	Total
**Bengals**	7	10	21	7	**45**
Dolphins	7	7	0	7	**21**

at Hard Rock Stadium, Miami Gardens, Florida

- Date: December 21
- Game time: 1:00 p.m. EST
- Game weather: Partly cloudy, 81 °F (27 °C)
- Game attendance: 65,885
- Referee: John Hussey
- TV announcers (CBS): Spero Dedes, Adam Archuleta and Aditi Kinkhabwala
- Recap, Game Book

Game information

**First quarter**

- CIN – Tee Higgins 9-yard pass from Joe Burrow (Evan McPherson kick), 3:57. Bengals 7–0. **Drive: 7 plays, 91 yards, 4:01.**
- MIA – De'Von Achane 48-yard run (Riley Patterson kick), 2:25. Tied 7–7. **Drive: 3 plays, 65 yards, 1:32.**

**Second quarter**

- CIN – Evan McPherson 45-yard field goal, 6:01. Bengals 10–7. **Drive: 11 plays, 53 yards, 5:42.**
- MIA – Malik Washington 9-yard run (Riley Patterson kick), 2:24. Dolphins 14–10. **Drive: 7 plays, 68 yards, 3:37.**
- CIN – Samaje Perine 4-yard run (Evan McPherson kick), 1:24. Bengals 17–14. **Drive: 7 plays, 56 yards, 1:00.**

**Third quarter**

- CIN – Chase Brown 9-yard pass from Joe Burrow (Evan McPherson kick), 9:43. Bengals 24–14. **Drive: 6 plays, 34 yards, 3:19.**
- CIN – Chase Brown 12-yard run (Evan McPherson kick), 8:32. Bengals 31–14. **Drive: 2 plays, 35 yards, 0:47.**
- CIN – Chase Brown 5-yard pass from Joe Burrow (Evan McPherson kick), 2:25. Bengals 38–14. **Drive: 6 plays, 53 yards, 2:54.**

**Fourth quarter**

- CIN – Mike Gesicki 17-yard pass from Joe Burrow (Evan McPherson kick), 13:32. Bengals 45–14. **Drive: 7 plays, 52 yards, 3:40.**
- MIA – Jaylen Wright 3-yard run (Riley Patterson kick), 3:43. Bengals 45–21. **Drive: 9 plays, 97 yards, 5:27.**

**Top passers**

- CIN – Joe Burrow – 25/32, 309 yards, 4 TD
- MIA – Quinn Ewers – 20/30, 260 yards, 2 INT

**Top rushers**

- CIN – Chase Brown – 12 rushes, 66 yards, TD
- MIA – De'Von Achane – 15 rushes, 81 yards, TD

**Top receivers**

- CIN – Ja'Marr Chase – 9 receptions, 109 yards
- MIA – Jaylen Waddle – 5 receptions, 72 yards

With the win, the Bengals improved to 5–10 and finished 1–3 against the AFC East. Cincinnati also finished 3–5 on the road.

==== Week 17: vs. Arizona Cardinals ====
Week 17: Arizona Cardinals at Cincinnati Bengals – Game summary

Quarter	1	2	3	4	Total
Cardinals	0	7	0	7	**14**
**Bengals**	7	16	14	0	**37**

at Paycor Stadium, Cincinnati, Ohio

- Date: December 28
- Game time: 1:00 p.m. EST
- Game weather: Overcast, 65 °F (18 °C)
- Game attendance: 61,402
- Referee: Clay Martin
- TV announcers (Fox): Kevin Kugler, Daryl Johnston and Allison Williams
- Recap, Game Book

Game information

**First quarter**

- CIN – Ja'Marr Chase 13-yard pass from Joe Burrow (Evan McPherson kick), 9:17. Bengals 7–0. **Drive: 12 plays, 72 yards, 5:43.**

**Second quarter**

- CIN – Samaje Perine 1-yard run (kick failed), 14:58. Bengals 13–0. **Drive: 12 plays, 79 yards, 7:50.**
- ARI – Michael Wilson 38-yard pass from Jacoby Brissett (Chad Ryland kick), 11:44. Bengals 13–7. **Drive: 5 plays, 70 yards, 3:14.**
- CIN – Evan McPherson 57-yard field goal, 3:21. Bengals 16–7. **Drive: 10 plays, 60 yards, 5:48.**
- CIN – Ja'Marr Chase 8-yard pass from Joe Burrow (Evan McPherson kick), 1:15. Bengals 23–7. **Drive: 3 plays, 36 yards, 1:06.**

**Third quarter**

- CIN – Chase Brown 6-yard run (Evan McPherson kick), 7:33. Bengals 30–7. **Drive: 11 plays, 84 yards, 6:24.**
- CIN – Chase Brown 1-yard run (Evan McPherson kick), 1:38. Bengals 37–7. **Drive: 10 plays, 82 yards, 4:45.**

**Fourth quarter**

- ARI – Trey McBride 18-yard pass from Jacoby Brissett (Chad Ryland kick), 1:50. Bengals 37–14. **Drive: 16 plays, 92 yards, 4:30.**

**Top passers**

- ARI – Jacoby Brissett – 21/37, 212 yards, 2 TD
- CIN – Joe Burrow – 24/31, 305 yards, 2 TD

**Top rushers**

- ARI – Michael Carter – 7 rushes, 29 yards
- CIN – Chase Brown – 22 rushes, 101 yards, 2 TD

**Top receivers**

- ARI – Michael Wilson – 5 receptions, 89 yards, TD
- CIN – Ja'Marr Chase – 7 receptions, 60 yards, 2 TD

With the win, the Bengals improved to 6–10 and finished 1–4 against the NFC. Ja'Marr Chase also became the first wide receiver in NFL history to complete at least 80 catches, 7 touchdowns, and 1,000 yards in each of the first 5 seasons of his career.

==== Week 18: vs. Cleveland Browns ====
Week 18: Cleveland Browns at Cincinnati Bengals – Game summary

Quarter	1	2	3	4	Total
**Browns**	7	7	3	3	**20**
Bengals	6	6	0	6	**18**

at Paycor Stadium, Cincinnati, Ohio

- Date: January 4
- Game time: 1:00 p.m. EST
- Game weather: Sunny, 37 °F (3 °C)
- Game attendance: 62,230
- Referee: Alex Kemp
- TV announcers (CBS): Tom McCarthy, Logan Ryan and Amanda Balionis
- Recap, Game Book

Game information

**First quarter**

- CIN – Chase Brown 4-yard pass from Joe Burrow (kick blocked), 7:59. Bengals 6–0. **Drive: 4 plays, 29 yards, 2:23.**
- CLE – Devin Bush Jr. 97-yard interception return (Andre Szmyt kick), 0:56. Browns 7–6.

**Second quarter**

- CLE – Sam Webb 47-yard fumble recovery (Andre Szmyt kick), 14:06. Browns 14–6. **Drive: 4 plays, 16 yards, 1:50.**
- CIN – Tee Higgins 13-yard pass from Joe Burrow (kick failed), 0:29. Browns 14–12. **Drive: 9 plays, 79 yards, 4:12.**

**Third quarter**

- CLE – Andre Szmyt 27-yard field goal, 8:00. Browns 17–12. **Drive: 12 plays, 56 yards, 7:00.**

**Fourth quarter**

- CIN – Ja'Marr Chase 4-yard pass from Joe Burrow (pass failed), 1:29. Bengals 18–17. **Drive: 7 plays, 61 yards, 1:12.**
- CLE – Andre Szmyt 49-yard field goal, 0:00. Browns 20–18. **Drive: 10 plays, 40 yards, 1:29.**

**Top passers**

- CLE – Shedeur Sanders – 11/22, 111 yards
- CIN – Joe Burrow – 29/39, 236 yards, 3 TD, INT

**Top rushers**

- CLE – Dylan Sampson – 10 rushes, 32 yards
- CIN – Chase Brown – 13 rushes, 72 yards

**Top receivers**

- CLE – Cedric Tillman – 1 reception, 23 yards
- CIN – Ja'Marr Chase – 8 receptions, 96 yards, TD

Although the Bengals entered the game as 9.5-point favorites, early mistakes by Joe Burrow put Cincinnati in a hole. Burrow threw a 97-yard pick-six to Browns linebacker Devin Bush Jr., then on the ensuing drive was sacked and fumbled, leading to a 47-yard fumble return touchdown by Browns cornerback Sam Webb, giving Cleveland a 14–6 lead. Additionally, Burrow was sacked by Browns defensive end Myles Garrett, allowing Garrett to set the NFL single-season sack record. Although the Bengals rallied to take an 18–17 lead with 1:29 remaining, Browns quarterback Shedeur Sanders led a late drive that set up kicker Andre Szmyt for a 49-yard game-winning field goal. Szmyt, who had missed an extra point and a field goal in Cleveland’s 17–16 loss to Cincinnati in Week 1, converted the kick as the Bengals fell in an upset loss. The Bengals ended their season at 6–11, finishing 3–3 against the AFC North and 3–6 at home.

=== Standings ===
==== Division ====
AFC North
	W	L	T	PCT	DIV	CONF	PF	PA	STK
^{(4)} Pittsburgh Steelers	10	7	0	.588	4–2	8–4	397	387	W1
Baltimore Ravens	8	9	0	.471	3–3	5–7	424	398	L1
Cincinnati Bengals	6	11	0	.353	3–3	5–7	414	492	L1
Cleveland Browns	5	12	0	.294	2–4	4–8	279	379	W2

==== Conference ====
AFC
Seed	Team	Division	W	L	T	PCT	DIV	CONF	SOS	SOV	STK
**Division leaders**
1 (Note: Denver finished ahead of New England based on common games (Denver 6–0 to New England 5–1 against: Cincinnati, Las Vegas, NY Giants, NY Jets and Tennessee).)	Denver Broncos	West	14	3	0	.824	5–1	9–3	.422	.378	W2
2	New England Patriots	East	14	3	0	.824	5–1	9–3	.391	.370	W3
3	Jacksonville Jaguars	South	13	4	0	.765	5–1	10–2	.478	.425	W8
4	Pittsburgh Steelers	North	10	7	0	.588	4–2	8–4	.503	.453	W1
**Wild cards**
5 (Note: Houston finished ahead of Buffalo based on head-to-head victory.)	Houston Texans	South	12	5	0	.706	5–1	10–2	.522	.441	W9
6	Buffalo Bills	East	12	5	0	.706	4–2	9–3	.471	.412	W1
7	Los Angeles Chargers	West	11	6	0	.647	5–1	8–4	.469	.425	L2
**Did not qualify for the postseason**
8 (Note: Indianapolis finished ahead of Baltimore based on conference record (Indianapolis 6–6 to Baltimore 5–7).)	Indianapolis Colts	South	8	9	0	.471	2–4	6–6	.540	.382	L7
9	Baltimore Ravens	North	8	9	0	.471	3–3	5–7	.507	.408	L1
10	Miami Dolphins	East	7	10	0	.412	3–3	3–9	.488	.378	L1
11 (Note: Cincinnati finished ahead of Kansas City based on conference record (Cincinnati 5–7 to Kansas City 3–9).)	Cincinnati Bengals	North	6	11	0	.353	3–3	5–7	.521	.451	L1
12	Kansas City Chiefs	West	6	11	0	.353	1–5	3–9	.514	.363	L6
13	Cleveland Browns	North	5	12	0	.294	2–4	4–8	.486	.418	W2
14 (Note: Las Vegas finished ahead of NY Jets and Tennessee based on conference record (Las Vegas 3–9 to NY Jets 2–10 and Tennessee 2–10).)	Las Vegas Raiders	West	3	14	0	.176	1–5	3–9	.538	.451	W1
15 (Note: NY Jets finished ahead of Tennessee based on strength of victory (NY Jets .373 to Tennessee .275).)	New York Jets	East	3	14	0	.176	0–6	2–10	.552	.373	L5
16	Tennessee Titans	South	3	14	0	.176	0–6	2–10	.574	.275	L2
**Tiebreakers** (Note: When breaking ties for three or more teams under the NFL's rules, they are first broken within divisions, then comparing only the highest ranked remaining team from each division.)
