= Bedarida =

Bedarida or Bédarida is a surname. Notable people with the surname include:

- François Bédarida (1926–2001), French historian
- Guido Bedarida (1900–1962), Italian writer
- Guy Bedarida (born 1963), Italian-born French jewelry designer
