= Angela Lindvall =

American model

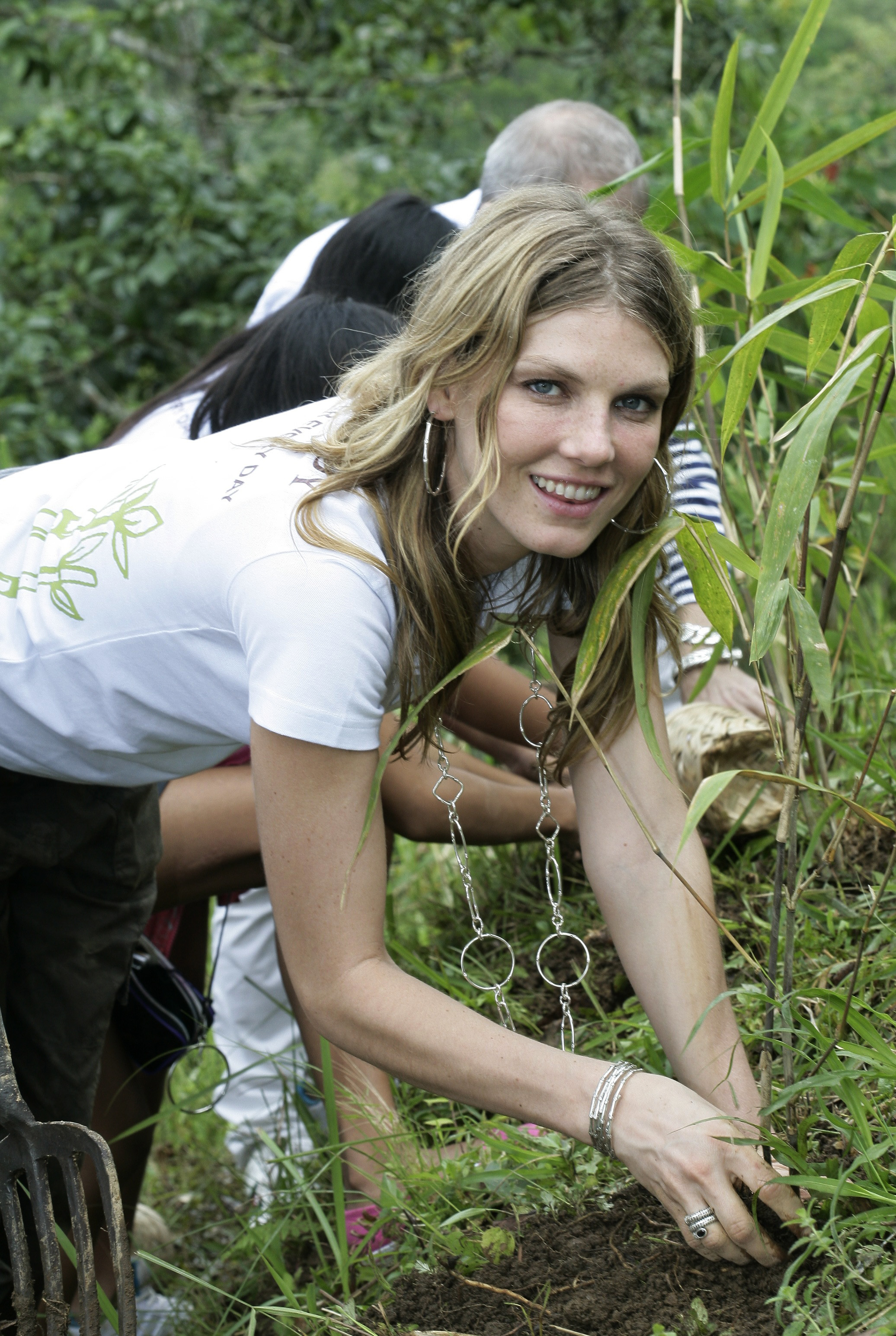
- Lindvall in Bali, Indonesia, 2010
- Born: January 14, 1979 (age 47); Midwest City, Oklahoma, U.S.
- Occupations: Model; actress
- Spouse: William Edwards (m. 2002; div. 2006)
- Children: 2
- Relatives: Audrey Lindvall (sister); Erik Lindvall (brother)
- Modeling information
- Height: 1.80 m (5 ft 11 in)
- Hair color: Dark blonde
- Eye color: Blue
- Agency: The Management NYC

Angela Lindvall (born January 14, 1979) is an American model and actress. She was first discovered by an IMG scout when she was 14 years old, and was immediately signed with IMG New York. She took a brief break from modeling but returned when she was 17. From the late 1990s to the early 2000s, she was featured on numerous magazine covers including Vogue, Elle, Harper's Bazaar, Marie Claire, Numéro, and W. She has been the face of major brands including Chanel, Calvin Klein, Dior, Versace, and Louis Vuitton.

As an actress, she has appeared in several films, including a starring role in CQ (2001), and minor roles in Kiss Kiss Bang Bang (2005) and Small Apartments (2010). She was also the host for season 1 of the fashion reality television Project Runway All Stars, a spin-off of the series Project Runway.

== Early life ==
Lindvall was born in Midwest City, Oklahoma, to Randall Lindvall, a pharmacist, and Laura Rasdall, a medical technologist and massage therapist. She was raised in Lee's Summit, Missouri, and attended Lee's Summit High School. While doing a local Kansas City fashion show, at age 14, a talent scout spotted her and she signed with IMG.

== Career ==
=== Modeling ===
Lindvall has appeared on the covers of many notable magazines, such as ELLE, Harper's Bazaar, Marie Claire, Numero, Vogue, I-D and W. She walked in the Victoria's Secret fashion shows in 2000, 2003, 2005, 2006, 2007, 2008, and appeared in Victoria's Secret Holiday Commercial in 2004. and has also appeared in the Fendi, Calvin Klein, Christian Dior, Tommy Hilfiger, Jil Sander, Chanel, Versace, Prada, Gap, Jimmy Choo, Iceberg, DKNY, Chloe, Hermes, Valentino, Louis Vuitton, and H&M campaigns. Off the runway, Lindvall has appeared in commercials for H&M, The Gap, and Victoria's Secret. She was the face of the Spanish "high-street" store Zara, and was featured in their spring/summer 2007 campaign. Lindvall has also appeared in the Sports Illustrated Swimsuit Issue. In 1999, she was named Model of the Year by Vogue.

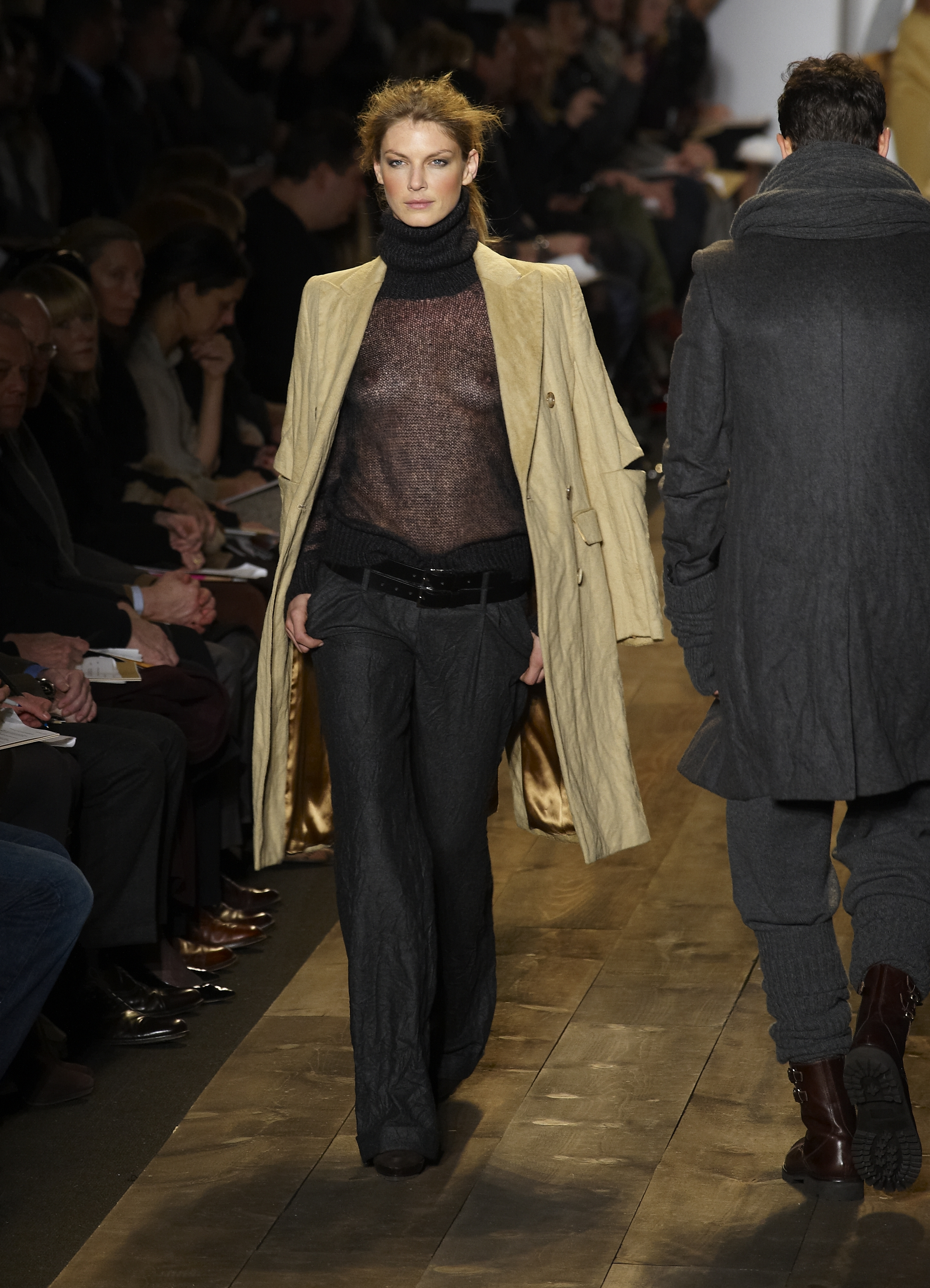
Lindvall walking the runway for Michael Kors at New York Fashion Week in February 2010

In 2010, she also renewed her contract with Jimmy Choo and signed a contract to become the face of John Hardy, appearing in all of the company's advertising campaigns between Fall 2010 and Fall 2011. Lindvall partnered with Bedarida again in early 2011 to create the Hijau Dua collection. A continuation of the Hijau collection, a portion of the proceeds from the sale of Hijau Dua pieces were donated to the planting of bamboo seedlings in Bali.

Since 2015 Angela became a certified yoga instructor, health coach, and doula. She created a platform called Peace Begins In Me which holds workshops and retreats. She launched a Jewelry line with Article 22 called "Peace Begins In Me" made from recycled war shrapnel.

=== Film and television ===
As an actress, Lindvall starred in the 2001 comedy-drama film CQ opposite Jeremy Davies. She has also had minor roles in the films Kiss Kiss Bang Bang (2005), and Small Apartments (2010). She can also be seen in the DKNY promotional films New York Stories (2003) and DKNY Road Stories (2004). In 2011, Lindvall appeared in the TV series Hawaii Five-0. The following year, she hosted season 1 of the fashion reality television Project Runway All Stars, a spin-off of the series Project Runway.

=== Sustainability ===
Lindvall is an ardent environmentalist and is the founder and president of the Collage Foundation, an organization promoting sustainability and environmentally conscious choices among young people. She was named "Best Dressed Environmentalist" in 2004 and 2005 by the Sustainable Style Foundation.

Combining her experience in the fashion industry and her passion for the environment, in 2009 she teamed up with Edun Live and Yoox.com to design a line of eco-friendly clothing where all proceeds would be donated to Green Cross International.

=== Jewelry ===
In 2007, during a scouting trip for Alter Eco in Bali, she visited the John Hardy compound and was inspired by the company's value of environmental sustainability. Through a collaboration with John Hardy's head designer and creative director, Guy Bedarida, she helped to design the Hijau collection. Of the collaboration, Bedarida comments "She is a mother, she works. She is very real." All net proceeds from the sale of the Hijau Charity bracelet were donated to Forest Ethics.

In October 2011, Lindvall started her own line with John Hardy called Angela by John Hardy. Sold on QVC, the collection is inspired by Lindvall's travels and interest in ancient cultures. The following year, Lindvall partnered with Article22 on a jewelry collection that promoted peace and well-being. The capsule collection called "I Am Love, I Am Light, I Am Peace", combined 14-karat gold and silver with melted shrapnel. With the pieces being geometric, Lindvall said of the collection, "it represents the symbiotic relationship between man and nature and the universe".

== Personal life ==
In 2001, Lindvall met South African diver William Edwards while vacationing in the British Virgin Islands. A year later, the couple married, and then divorced in 2006. That same year, Lindvall's younger sister, model Audrey Lindvall, was killed by a fuel tanker while riding her bicycle in Lee's Summit, Missouri.

In 2006, Lindvall purchased a 7 1/2-acre equestrian-zoned property for $4,550,000 in Topanga, California. She currently lives there with her two sons.

Angela leads workshops and meditations and retreats around the world through her company Peace Begins With Me.

== Filmography ==
Year	Title	Role	Notes	Ref.
2001	CQ	Dragonfly / Valentine		
2003	New York Stories	Angela	Short film	
2004	DKNY Road Stories	Angela	Short film	
2005	Kiss Kiss Bang Bang	Flicka		
2009	Life Blood	God / Waitress		
2010	Somewhere	Blonde in Mercedes		
2011	Hawaii Five-0	Jordan	TV series (Episode: "Ho'ohuli Na'au")	
2012	Small Apartments	Flight Attendant / Lisa		
2012	A Glimpse Inside the Mind of Charles Swan III	Veiled Woman		
2013	Our Wild Hearts	Katie	Television film	
2016	M.I.L.F. $	Angela Lindvall	Music video	
