= Tanner Hudson =

American football player (born 1994)

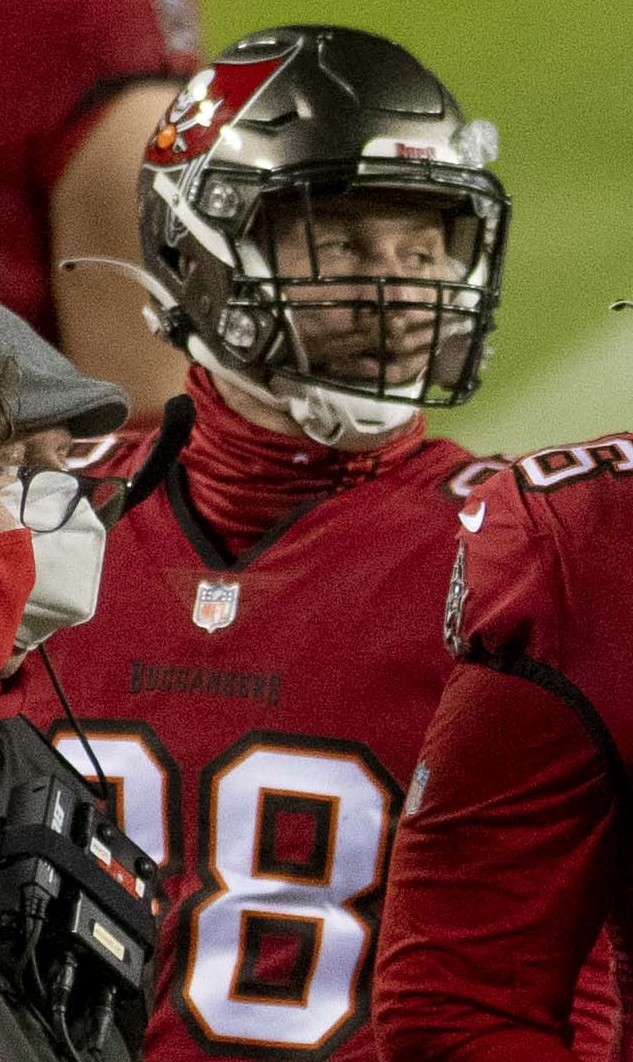
- Hudson with the Tampa Bay Buccaneers in 2021

No. 87 – Cincinnati Bengals
- Position: Tight end
- Roster status: Injured reserve

Personal information
- Born: November 12, 1994 (age 32); Paris, Tennessee, U.S.
- Listed height: 6 ft 5 in (1.96 m)
- Listed weight: 241 lb (109 kg)

Career information
- High school: Camden Central (Camden, Tennessee)
- College: Memphis (2013); Southern Arkansas (2014–2017)
- NFL draft: 2018: undrafted

Career history
- Tampa Bay Buccaneers (2018–2020); San Francisco 49ers (2021); New York Giants (2022); Cincinnati Bengals (2022–present)

Awards and highlights
- Super Bowl champion (LV); First-team All-GAC (2017); Second-team All-GAC (2016)

Career NFL statistics as of Week 5, 2026
- Receptions: 99
- Receiving yards: 906
- Receiving touchdowns: 5
- Stats at Pro Football Reference

Tanner Hudson (born November 12, 1994) is an American professional football tight end for the Cincinnati Bengals of the National Football League (NFL). He played college football for the Southern Arkansas Muleriders.

== Early life ==
Hudson was born in Paris, Tennessee, and grew up in Big Sandy, Tennessee. He attended Camden Central High School, where he played football and basketball. In football, Hudson played quarterback, kicker, and punter and was named the District 11-AA Most Valuable Punter as a junior after averaging 38.7 yards per punt while also passing for 581 yards and seven touchdowns with 152 yards and three touchdowns rushing. His senior season was cut short after four games due to injury.

== College career ==
Hudson began his collegiate career as a quarterback and punter at Memphis, redshirting his freshman season. He opted to transfer to Southern Arkansas University following his redshirt year.

In his first season with the Muleriders, Hudson changed positions to wide receiver and eventually tight end while handling the team's punting duties. In each of his last three seasons Hudson caught at least 40 passes and had over 600 receiving yards. In his junior season, he set career highs with 48 catches, 763 receiving yards and nine touchdown receptions and was named second-team All-Great American Conference (GAC) while also finishing third in the conference in yards per punt with 41.9. As a senior, Hudson had 43 receptions for 624 yards and six touchdowns and was named first-team All-GAC and a second-team All-American by the American Football Coaches Association and the Division II Conference Commissioner's Association. He finished his collegiate career with 143 receptions for 2,152 yards and 25 touchdown catches.

== Professional career ==
Pre-draft measurables
Height	Weight
6 ft 4 1/4 in (1.94 m)	239 lb (108 kg)
Values from Pro Day

=== Tampa Bay Buccaneers ===
==== 2018 ====
Hudson signed with the Tampa Bay Buccaneers as an undrafted free agent on April 29, 2018. He was cut at the end of training camp but was re-signed to the Buccaneers practice squad on September 2, 2018. Hudson was promoted to the active roster for the final two weeks of the 2018 season, but did not appear in either game.

==== 2019 ====
Hudson made the Buccaneers final roster to begin the 2019 season. Hudson made his NFL debut on October 27, 2019, against the Tennessee Titans. Hudson caught his first career pass, a 12-yard reception from Jameis Winston, on November 3, 2019, in a 40–33 loss to the Seattle Seahawks. Hudson finished the season with two receptions for 26 yards in nine games played with one start.

==== 2020 ====
Hudson re-signed with the Buccaneers on a one-year contract on March 13, 2020. He was waived by the Buccaneers during final roster cuts on September 5, 2020, and was signed to the practice squad the following day. He was elevated to the active roster on September 19 for the team's week 2 game against the Carolina Panthers, and reverted to the practice squad the day after the game. He was promoted to the active roster on September 23, 2020. Hudson finished the season with three receptions on seven targets for 41 yards. Hudson played in the Super Bowl LV victory over the Kansas City Chiefs, earning a single target.

Hudson was given an exclusive-rights free agent tender by the Buccaneers on March 9, 2021. He was released on August 31, 2021.

=== San Francisco 49ers ===
On September 3, 2021, Hudson was signed to the San Francisco 49ers' practice squad. He was promoted to the active roster on January 1, 2022. Hudson was waived by the 49ers on January 7, and re-signed to the practice squad. He signed a reserve/future contract with San Francisco on February 2. Hudson was waived on August 23.

=== New York Giants ===
On August 25, 2022, the New York Giants signed Hudson. On December 3, Hudson was waived by the Giants.

=== Cincinnati Bengals ===
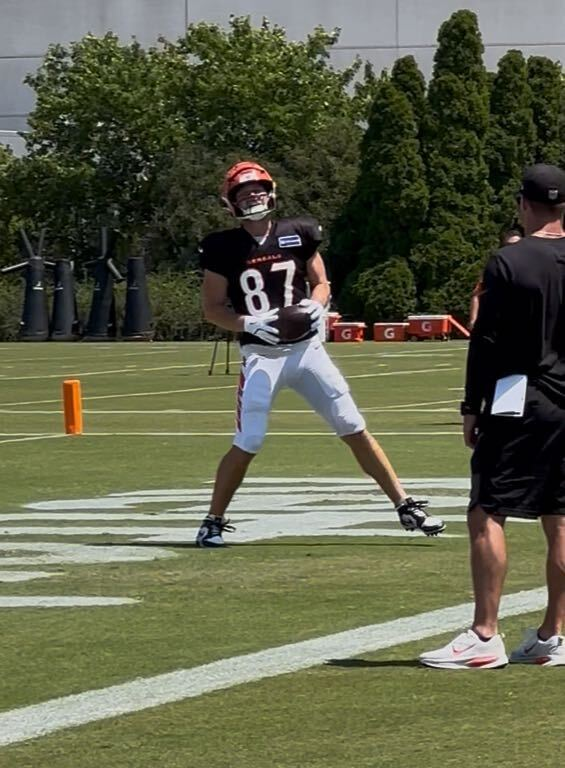
Tanner Hudson at Cincinnati Bengals training camp in August 2025

==== 2022 ====
On December 6, 2022, the Cincinnati Bengals signed Hudson to their practice squad. He signed a reserve/future contract with Cincinnati on January 31, 2023.

==== 2023–present ====
Hudson was released on August 29, 2023, and signed back to the practice squad the following day. On September 25, he was promoted to the active roster and reverted back to the practice squad after the Week 3 game against the Los Angeles Rams. Ahead of the Bengals Week 4 game against the Tennessee Titans, Hudson was elevated a second time to the active roster on September 30. On November 1, Hudson was signed to the active roster. Hudson started the Week 9 game against the Buffalo Bills, and netted four receptions for 45 yards. The following week against the Houston Texans he had a career-high six receptions in the game, five of which came in the first quarter alone.

Hudson scored his first career touchdown in Week 14 win against the Indianapolis Colts. He finished the season with 39 receptions for 352 yards in addition to his one touchdown, making 2023 his best statistical season of his career.

On March 15, 2024, Hudson re-signed with the Bengals. He made 11 appearances for Cincinnati, recording 19 receptions for 154 yards and one touchdown; he also logged one rush attempt for one yard.

On March 7, 2025, Hudson signed a one-year contract extension with the Bengals. In 15 appearances (one start) for Cincinnati, Hudson compiled 19 receptions for 168 yards and two touchdowns.

On January 19, 2026, Hudson signed another one-year contract extension with the Bengals. On August 30, he was released by Cincinnati as a part of final roster cuts and re-signed to the practice squad two days later. On September 29, he was signed to the active roster. He suffered a torn pectoral in Week 5 and was placed on injured reserve on October 19.

== Career statistics ==
=== NFL ===
Hudson has been one of the NFL's most productive preseason performers in recent years. Pro Football Focus ranked him third among wide receivers and tight ends in preseason receiving grade since 2016, while he led all players in both receiving yards and receiving touchdowns during that span.

Preseason
Year	Team	Games		Receiving				
Year	Team	GP	GS	Rec	Yds	Avg	Lng	TD
2018	TB	4	0	4	45	11.3	19	0
2019	TB	4	1	19	245	12.9	31	3
2020	TB	Cancelled						
2021	TB	3	0	12	131	10.9	26	0
2022	SF	2	0	7	70	10.0	22	1
2022	NYG	1	0	1	4	4.0	4	0
2023	CIN	2	0	8	71	8.9	20	0
2024	CIN	3	0	5	32	6.4	12	0
2025	CIN	2	0	9	80	8.9	21	2
2026	CIN	1	0	2	20	10.0	15	0
Career		22	1	67	698	10.4	31	6

==== Regular season ====
Year	Team	Games		Receiving				
Year	Team	GP	GS	Rec	Yds	Avg	Lng	TD
2018	TB	DNP						
2019	TB	9	1	2	26	13.0	14	0
2020	TB	11	0	3	41	13.7	20	0
2021	SF	2	0	0	0	—	—	0
2022	NYG	11	0	10	132	13.2	27	0
2023	CIN	12	1	39	352	9.0	26	1
2024	CIN	11	0	19	154	8.1	19	1
2025	CIN	15	1	19	168	8.8	33	2
2026	CIN	4	1	7	33	4.7	7	1
Career		75	4	99	906	9.2	33	5
