= Ata Pirmoradi =

Swedish football coach

Personal information
- Date of birth: 1985 (age 40–41)
- Height: 1.78 m (5 ft 10 in)

Managerial career
- Years: Team
- 2008–2015: Pars FC Örebro
- 2010–2014: Pars FC Örebro(Futsal)
- 2015: Spartak Örebro Futsal Club(Futsal)

Ata Pirmoradi is a Swedish football and futsal coach and his last assignment was when he coached Spartak Örebro Futsal Club in the Swedish Futsal League(SFL). Ata Pirmoradi is also one of the founders of the Swedish football club Pars FC Örebro in 2007.

== Coaching career ==
Pirmoradi started his football coaching career in division 7 football in Sweden 2008 and managed to get his team promoted to division 4 in only three years. In his futsal coaching career he managed to get his team promoted from division 3 to division 1. In 2015, he took over Spartak Örebro Futsal Club in the Swedish Futsal League(SFL).
