= CQ (film) =

2001 film by Roman Coppola

- American release poster
- Directed by: Roman Coppola
- Written by: Roman Coppola
- Produced by: Gary Marcus
- Starring: Jeremy Davies; Angela Lindvall; Élodie Bouchez; Gérard Depardieu; Massimo Ghini; Giancarlo Giannini; John Phillip Law; Jason Schwartzman; Dean Stockwell; Billy Zane
- Cinematography: Robert D. Yeoman
- Edited by: Leslie Jones; Louise Rubacky
- Music by: Mellow
- Production companies: United Artists; American Zoetrope; Delux Productions; Film Fund Luxembourg
- Distributed by: MGM Distribution Co. (United States and Canada); Pretty Pictures (France); 01 Distribution (Italy)
- Release dates: May 12, 2001 (Cannes); May 24, 2002 (United States)
- Running time: 88 minutes
- Countries: United States; Luxembourg; France; Italy
- Languages: English; French; Italian
- Budget: $7 million
- Box office: $499,891

CQ is a 2001 comedy-drama film written and directed by Roman Coppola in his feature directorial debut. It premiered out of competition at the 2001 Cannes Film Festival.

The film is an homage to 1960s European spy/sci-fi spoofs like 1968's Barbarella and Danger: Diabolik as well as the 1967 documentary spoof David Holzman's Diary. The cinematography is by Robert D. Yeoman. The film stars Jeremy Davies and Angela Lindvall, also co-starring Élodie Bouchez, Jason Schwartzman, Giancarlo Giannini, Gérard Depardieu, Billy Zane, John Phillip Law, and Dean Stockwell.

The film features an original soundtrack by French electronic band Mellow, which was released on Emperor Norton Records.

CQ was released by United Artists. The title CQ is revealed to be code for "seek you", in line with the movie's theme of seeking and finding love.

== Plot ==
CQ uses the format of a film within a film. In Paris in 1969, young and introverted film editor Paul Ballard (Jeremy Davies) is currently working on a science-fiction adventure film set in the futuristic year of 2001, called Codename: Dragonfly, written and directed by renowned director Andrezej (Gérard Depardieu).

The main character of Codename: Dragonfly is the eponymous Dragonfly, a sexy freelance super-agent who lives in a spaceship perched atop the Eiffel Tower and undertakes assignments for the "World Council". Dragonfly's latest mission is to stop a revolutionary leader known as "Mr. E" (Billy Zane) who is based on the "far-out" side of the Moon. The World Council turns for help to Dragonfly, reluctantly so because she charges huge sums of money - with which the council literally showers her.

Andrezej is utterly infatuated with his film's star who is playing Dragonfly, Valentine (Angela Lindvall), a young American whom he discovered at a political rally. Paul, an aspiring filmmaker himself, regularly borrows cameras and other equipment in order to film his own project: a black-and-white documentary of his own self-reflections. When the producers prove unhappy with Andrezej's ideas - or apparent lack of any real idea - for the movie's ending, they fire him. They are particularly upset with Andrezej's ideas for what they had expected would be an action movie: Andrezej believes the movie should end with a whimper instead of a bang, in order to subvert the audience's expectations.

Andrezej is first replaced with the shallow, flashy Felix DeMarco (Jason Schwartzman), but ultimately the producers settle on Paul as the new director. They impress on him that his main task is to come up with a satisfying end to the movie, the filmmakers having determined that Dragonfly must chase after and finally confront a mysterious figure in a tunnel alleyway, but no one having been able to decide whom that mysterious figure should be.

Much as Andrezej before him, Paul finds his efforts to complete Codename: Dragonfly stymied by his infatuation both with Valentine and with the persona of Dragonfly. Paul has a girlfriend, Marlene (Elodie Bouchez), an Air France flight attendant who makes time for Paul despite her schedule, his obvious growing infatuation with Valentine, his obsession with film making and his self-absorption. Ultimately, Marlene leaves Paul. Paul is also challenged by the apparent work of a saboteur, who cuts up footage before it can be edited, and who sends cryptic threatening messages to the remaining crew. Others suspect Andrezej - who resents being fired and losing control of the film.

Paul puts himself under increasing pressure from his inability to come up with an ending for Codename: Dragonfly - which he is told “has to be fabulous” - although isolated notions and images might slowly be coming together in his head. The movie's high-living Italian producer, Enzo (Giancarlo Giannini), not intimately involved in the production shoot but still subtly fatherly and supportive, tells Paul a good ending must be exciting and must finally resolve the mystery for the audience but “surprise them a little.” “Astonish me,” he challenges Paul. Paul continues moving forward, making certain changes in the plot, and occasionally plunging into personal fantasies in which the character of Dragonfly soothes him as his loving companion against the stress of making the movie.

As the crew prepares to shoot the climactic chase scene, the saboteur sneaks onto the set and steals their finished footage. Valentine (still costumed and made up as Dragonfly from the shoot) and Paul jump into Dragonfly's futuristic prop car from the movie and chase the saboteur through Paris, with the fantasy of Dragonfly's world melding slightly into Paul's reality, and as the car chase ends Paul and Valentine/Dragonfly kiss. Paul confronts the saboteur in an alleyway on the banks of the Seine not unlike the climactic alleyway in Codename: Dragonfly, and it is confirmed the saboteur is Andrezej. In a moment of vulnerability and mutual respect as filmmakers - even shared identity - Paul convinces Andrezej to return the film, while Andrezej secures Paul's promise that a main aspect of the movie's ending will remain as Andrezej had wished, though their exchange reveals nothing else. And, in a secondary scene shortly after, Paul gets a hint that slavishly filming all the events in one's life may not be the best way to capture their fleeting genuine essence.

The movie's ending is shot according to Paul's idea. It plays for us as it will be seen in the finished movie, and the identity of the mysterious figure chosen by Paul is revealed. The ending Paul devises is everything the producer asked for. It is unexpected, satisfying, and for Codename: Dragonfly even astonishing, carrying in its plot twist an emotional heft and genuineness that lifts the otherwise cheesy movie. The final scene finishes for us and fades out.

Finally, Paul is a guest speaker at a French film festival in mid-1970. Despite signs of stature, he is asked by a festival participant to pass along a script to Felix DeMarco, as though he is still in the other man's shadow and suggesting quality and sincerity must always compete with the shallow and foolish. The festival also presents Paul's own film - the collection of self-reflections he'd been shooting over the course of Codename: Dragonfly. In voiceovers accompanying Paul's film, it is established that Marlene and Paul never got back together, and the last shot of his film, finally transitioning into color, suggests Valentine is now a part of his life.

== Cast ==
- Jeremy Davies as Paul Ballard
- Angela Lindvall as Valentine / Dragonfly
- Elodie Bouchez as Marlene
- Gérard Depardieu as Andrezej
- Giancarlo Giannini as Enzo
- Massimo Ghini as Fabrizio
- Jason Schwartzman as Felix DeMarco
- Billy Zane as Mr. E.
- John Phillip Law as World Council Chairman
- Silvio Muccino as Pippo
- Dean Stockwell as Dr. Ballard
- Natalia Vodianova as Brigit
- Sofia Coppola as Enzo's Mistress
- Bernard Verley as Trailer Voiceover Actor
- L.M. Kit Carson as Fantasy Critic
- Romain Duris as Hippie Filmmaker

== Reception ==
=== Critical response ===
The film holds a 67% rating on Rotten Tomatoes, based on 76 reviews, and an average rating of 6.1/10. The site's consensus reads: "CQ is a stylish and fun homage to campy 1960s flicks". Metacritic gave the film a 56/100 "mixed or average" approval rating based on 26 reviews.
