= Pat Walker (footballer) =

Irish footballer (born 1959)

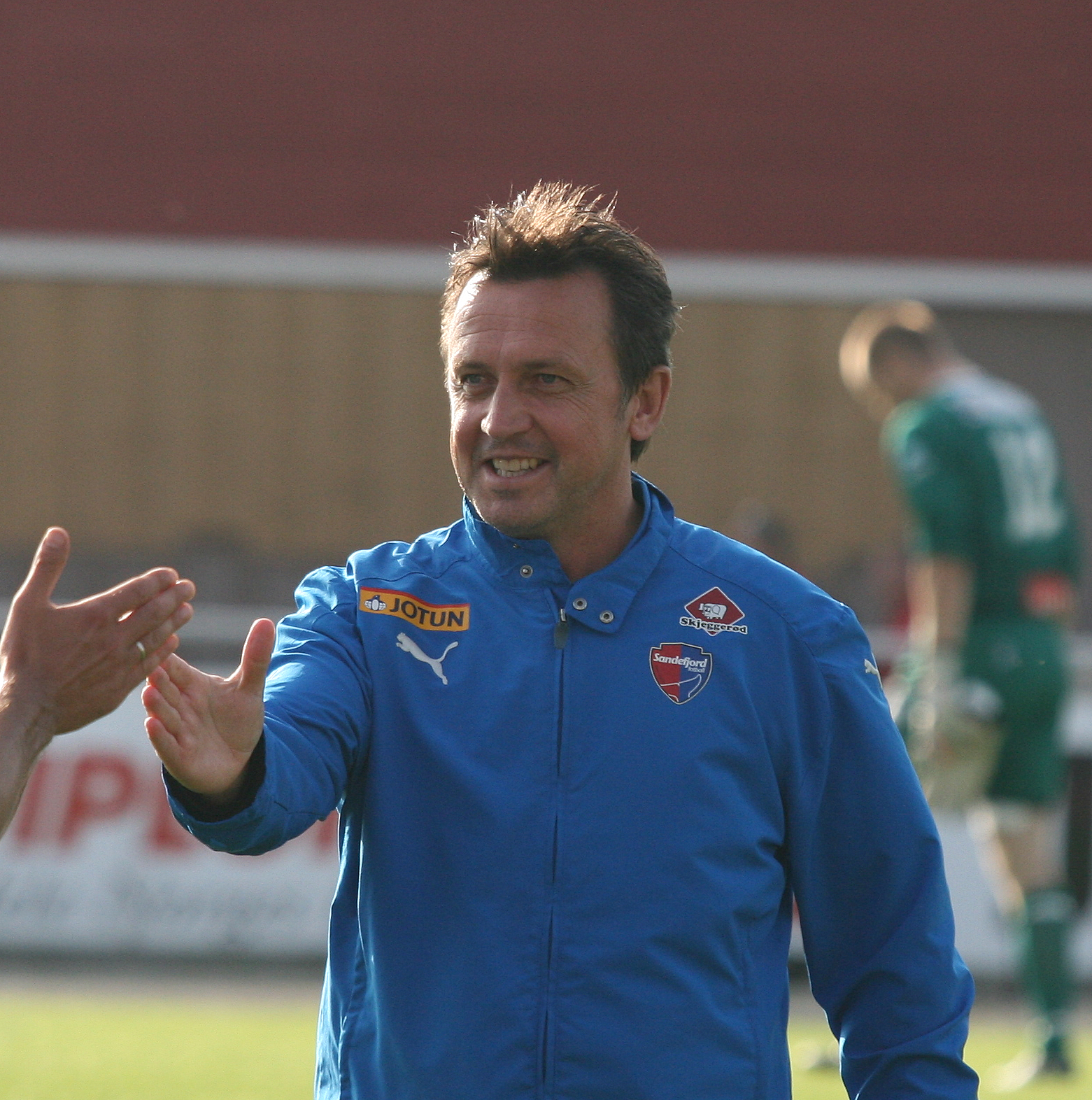

Personal information
- Full name: Patrick Joseph Walker
- Date of birth: 20 December 1959 (age 66)
- Place of birth: Carlow, Ireland
- Positions: Right back; midfielder

Senior career*
Years	Team	Apps	(Gls)
1977–1982	Gillingham	51	(3)
1982	OTP Oulu		
1982–1983	Bohemians	15	(0)
1983–1986	BK Häcken	15	(4)
1987–1991	GIF Sundsvall	40	(1)

International career
1977–1978	Republic of Ireland U21	2	(0)

Managerial career
- 1992–1993: Varbergs BoIS
- 1994–1996: Kalmar FF
- 2002–2004: GIF Sundsvall
- 2005–2007: Örebro
- 2008–2011: Sandefjord
- 2011: Assyriska FF
- * Club domestic league appearances and goals

Patrick Joseph Walker (born 20 December 1959) is an Irish former professional footballer.

== Playing career ==
He played for Gillingham between 1977 and 1981, making 51 appearances in the Football League. He also briefly played for Bohemians, before quitting the professional game and moving to Sweden.

=== International career ===
Walker earned two caps for the Republic of Ireland U21 side.

== Coaching career ==
Walker was coach of Varbergs BoIS, GIF Sundsvall between 2000 and 2004 and brought them to their highest league finish in the Allsvenskan to date. In 2005, he took over as manager of Örebro SK and helped them gain promotion to the Allsvenskan, before moving to Norway and Norwegian First Division club Sandefjord Fotball. He guided Sandefjord to their best league finish in the history of the club in 2010.

On 9 May 2011 he was fired from Sandefjord Fotball after a weak season opening, which included one win, two draws and two defeats in the first five matches.

In April 2016 he took over Pars FC Örebro as chairman and renamed the team to Scandinavian Football Club Örebro in order to make the team more professional and attract more players from around the world.

== Personal life ==
He is the father of footballers Kevin and Robert.
