= Pars FC Örebro =

Swedish football club

Pars FC Örebro/ Scandinavian
- Full name: Pars Football Club Örebro/ Scandinavian Football Academy
- Nickname(s): PFC Örebro
- Founded: 2007
- Head Coach: Pat Walker
- League: Swedish Football Division 4
- Website: http://www.svenskalag.se/pfc
| Home colours | Away colours |

Pars FC Örebro was founded in 2007 by Ata Pirmoradi and Sebastian Nyberg in Örebro and is currently playing in Swedish Football Division 4. In April 2016, Pat Walker took over the club and renamed it Scandinavian Football Club Örebro in order to make the team more professional and attract more players.

== Season to season ==
| Season | Level | Division | Section | Position | Movements |
|---|---|---|---|---|---|
| 2008 | Tier 9 | Division 7 | Division 7 Örebro Södra | 4th | |
| 2009 | Tier 9 | Division 7 | Division 7 Örebro Östra | 1st | Promoted |
| 2010 | Tier 8 | Division 6 | Division 6 Örebro Södra | 1st | Promoted |
| 2011 | Tier 7 | Division 5 | Division 5 Örebro Norra | 3rd | Promoted Playoffs |
| 2012 | Tier 6 | Division 4 | Division 4 Örebro | 10th | Relegated Playoffs |
| 2013 | Tier 7 | Division 5 | Division 5 Örebro Norra | 2nd | Promoted Playoffs |
| 2014 | Tier 6 | Division 4 | Division 4 Örebro | 10th | |
| 2015 | Tier 6 | Division 4 | Division 4 Örebro | 7th | |
| 2016 | Tier 6 | Division 4 | Division 4 Örebro | 3rd | |
| 2017 | Tier 6 | Division 4 | Division 4 Örebro | 1st | Promoted |
| 2018 | Tier 5 | Division 3 | Division 3 Västra Svealand | 11th | Relegated |
| 2019 | Tier 6 | Division 4 | Division 4 Örebro | 6th | |

== Notable players ==
This list of notable players comprises players who have been professional soccer players before or after their time in Pars FC Örebro

- (United States) Taylor Bowlin
- (Brazil) Breno Kessler
- (United States) Daniel Taylor
- (Sweden) Eric Jangholm Melin

== Futsal Season to season ==
| Season | Level | Division | Section | Position | Movements |
|---|---|---|---|---|---|
| 2010 | Tier 3 | Division 3 | Division 3 Futsal Örebro Mellersta | 1st | Promoted |
| 2011 | Tier 2 | Division 2 | Division 2 Futsal Örebro Södra | 1st | Promoted |
| 2012 | Tier 1 | Division 1 | Division 1 Futsal Örebro Norra | 1st | Champions |
| 2013 | Tier 1 | Division 1 | Division 1 Futsal Örebro Södra | 2nd | Runner-up |
| 2014* | Tier 2 | Division 1 | Division 1 Futsal Örebro Norra | 2nd | Runner-up |

* League restructuring in 2014 resulted in a new division being created at Tier 1 and subsequent divisions dropping a level.
