= Audrey Lindvall =

American model (1982–2006)

- Born: Audrey Kathryn Lindvall; August 11, 1982; Lee's Summit, Missouri, US
- Died: August 2, 2006 (aged 23); Lee's Summit, Missouri, US
- Relatives: Angela Lindvall (sister)
- Modeling information
- Height: 5 ft 9 in (175 cm)
- Hair color: Blonde
- Eye color: Blue

Audrey Kathryn Lindvall (August 11, 1982 – August 2, 2006) was an American model. She was the sister of supermodel Angela Lindvall, and the former face of Coach and Ann Taylor.

== Biography ==
Born in Lee's Summit, Missouri, to Randall, a pharmacist, and Laura Rasdall, she graduated from Lee's Summit High School in June 2001. Growing up with four sisters and one brother, it was her sister, Michelle, who wanted to be a model. Michelle and her other sister Angela, went to local Kansas City fashion shows. It was Angela however that was noticed by Kim Hoffman of Hoffman International.

After Angela signed with IMG she made it to the top of the fashion world, landing on the cover of Vogue. It was not long before Audrey was noticed by agents and photographers when she visited her sister in New York. Audrey soon signed with Ivan Bart with IMG.

Audrey desired to do something ecological, such as designing earth-friendly houses. She used to play with crayfish as a child and loved to ride her bike. Health conscious, Lindvall rode her bike in New York City, and did not think anything of riding in Lee's Summit, Missouri. She was hoping to attend college and to pursue other goals outside of modeling.

Audrey moved back to her father's house in Lee's Summit during July 2006, a stopping point on her move to Los Angeles, to be near Angela and her family. It was there that she was accidentally killed a month later.

The British indie rock band the Kooks dedicated one of their songs "Ooh La" to her memory.

== Death ==
On August 2, 2006, 23-year-old Lindvall was killed by a truck in Lee's Summit, Missouri, while out on a bicycle ride with a friend. Lindvall's bike accidentally hit the concrete curb next to a QuikTrip convenience store and she was thrown from her bike, landing under the wheels of a moving gas tanker truck.

== See also ==
- List of people who died in traffic collisions
