= Eric Gregory (American football) =

American football player (born 2000)

No. 95 – New England Patriots
- Position: Defensive tackle
- Roster status: Practice squad

Personal information
- Born: September 13, 2000 (age 26); Memphis, Tennessee, U.S.
- Listed height: 6 ft 3 in (1.91 m)
- Listed weight: 319 lb (145 kg)

Career information
- High school: IMG Academy (Bradenton, Florida)
- College: Arkansas (2019–2024)
- NFL draft: 2025: undrafted

Career history
- Cincinnati Bengals (2025)*; New England Patriots (2025); New England Patriots (2026–present)*
- * Offseason or practice squad member only

Career NFL statistics as of 2025
- Total tackles: 8
- Games played: 6
- Stats at Pro Football Reference

Eric Gregory (born September 13, 2000) is an American professional football nose tackle for the New England Patriots of the National Football League (NFL). He played college football for the Arkansas Razorbacks.

== Early life ==
Gregory originally attended Central High School in Memphis, Tennessee, before transferring to play at IMG Academy. Coming out of high school, he held offers from schools such as Arkansas, Auburn, Florida, Tennessee, Ole Miss, Memphis, Mississippi State, and LSU. Gregory initially committed to play college football for the Memphis Tigers before he flipped his commitment to play for the Arkansas Razorbacks.

== College career ==
As a freshman in 2019 Gregory appeared in just two games, where he notched four tackles. In week 7, he recorded his first career interception off of Harrison Bailey in a win over Tennessee. Gregory finished the 2020 season, playing in nine games where he totaled 27 tackles with three being for a loss, two and a half sacks, and an interception. In 2021, he totaled 27 tackles with four being for a loss, a sack, and a pass deflection. In 2022, Gregory notched 19 tackles with four being for a loss, and two sacks for Arkansas. In 2023, he recorded 16 tackles with three being for a loss, a sack, and a pass deflection. In 2024, Gregory tallied 42 tackles with five being for a loss, and three sacks. After the season, he declared for the 2025 NFL draft.

== Professional career ==
Pre-draft measurables
Height	Weight	Arm length	Hand span	Wingspan	40-yard dash	10-yard split	20-yard split	20-yard shuttle	Three-cone drill	Vertical jump	Broad jump	Bench press
6 ft 3 1/4 in (1.91 m)	319 lb (145 kg)	33 in (0.84 m)	9 5/8 in (0.24 m)	6 ft 9 1/4 in (2.06 m)	5.14 s	1.76 s	2.96 s	4.64 s	7.68 s	27.5 in (0.70 m)	9 ft 0 in (2.74 m)	28 reps
All values from NFL Combine/Pro Day

=== Cincinnati Bengals ===
On May 9, 2025, Gregory signed with the Cincinnati Bengals as an undrafted free agent after going unselected in the 2025 NFL draft. After making the initial 53-man roster, he was waived on August 28.

=== New England Patriots ===
On August 29, 2025, Gregory was claimed off waivers by the New England Patriots. He was placed on injured reserve on January 24, 2026, due to a knee injury.

On August 30, 2026, Gregory was released by the Patriots as part of final roster cuts, and was re–signed to the practice squad the next day.
