= Robert K. Dixon =

American government official and expert

Robert Dixon
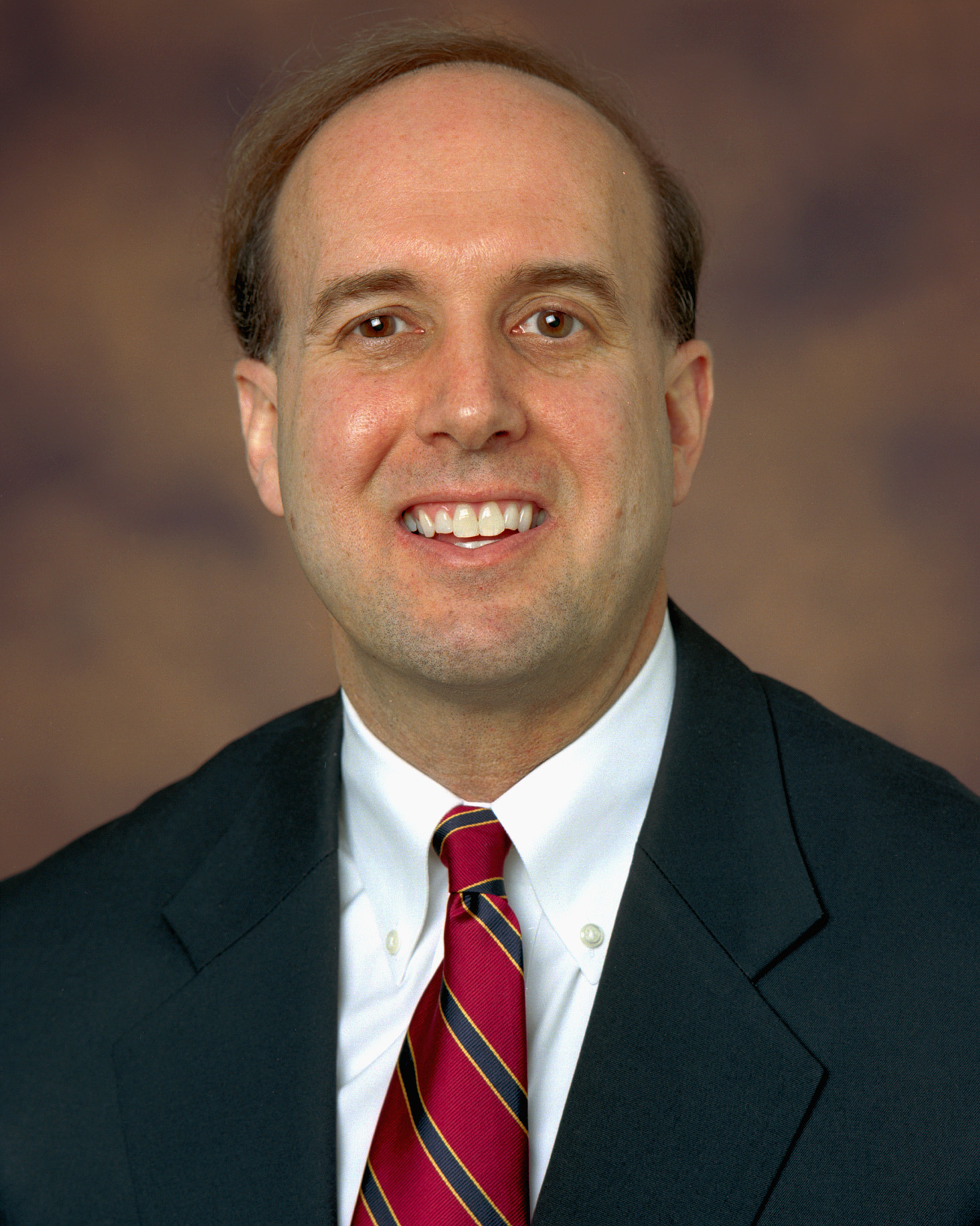

Robert K. Dixon is an energy, environment, and economic expert at the Office of International Affairs, US Department of Energy headquarters in Washington, DC, USA.

== Biography ==
Dixon is a native of Lee's Summit, Missouri. He graduated from Lee's Summit High School in 1973, and attended the University of Missouri, earning his Bachelor of Science in 1977, Master of Science in 1979, and Ph.D. in 1982.

Early in his professional life, he was a professor at the University of Minnesota (1982 to 1986) and Auburn University (1987 to 1989).

Dixon is married to Anita L. Dixon, and has two children: Caitlin S. Dixon and Colin A. Dixon.

== Career ==
He has been an adjunct and visiting professor, guest lecturer, executive in residence, and member of the university advisory boards at West Virginia University (2010 to 2012). He is currently an adjunct professor at American University in Washington, DC.

He led an industrial chemistry research and development program sponsored by Allied Chemical Corporation (1979 to 1982) and co-authored a U.S. patent for fertilizer formulation and applications (1988). He was a principal scientific advisor to, and startup investor in, Mycorr Tech, Inc. (1986 to 1989), a biotechnology firm subsequently acquired by Plant Health Care, Inc.

Dixon is editor-in-chief of the international scientific journal, Mitigation and Adaptation Strategies for Global Change since 1997. He was Guest Editor of Climatic Change and Energy Policy and currently serves on the CRC Press Sustainable Energy Development Editorial Board. He has authored, co-authored, or edited more than 125 journal articles and several books on energy and environment science and policy topics, such as Adapting to Climate Change: An International Perspective, The U.N. Framework Convention on Climate Change Activities Implemented Jointly (AIJ) Pilot: Experiences and Lessons Learned, Energy Technology Perspectives, Scenarios and Strategies to 2050, and others.

=== Government ===
For nearly three decades, Dixon has led U.S. government energy and environment science, technology and policy programs at three federal agencies:

- U.S. Agency for International Development (1986 to 1988; 1996), where he helped establish energy and natural resources programs and ministries in 11 South Asian countries.
- U.S. Environmental Protection Agency (1989 to 1991) where he worked to shape provisions of the Clean Air Act and the Energy Policy Act.
- U.S. Department of Energy (1997 to 2004; 2015 to present), where he is senior adviser, Office of International Affairs (2018), advising the Assistant Secretary on International Energy Policy. He was formerly director of EERE Strategic Programs (2015 - 2018) and EERE Deputy Assistant Secretary sfor Power Technologies (1999 - 2002).

Dixon has worked with organizations across the globe, and for Presidential councils and executive offices. He led two Presidential Initiatives (1992 to 1997), the U.S. Country Studies Program, and the Initiative on Joint Implementation.

=== White House ===
During the Administration of President G.W. Bush, Dixon served as Senior Director, White House Task Force on Energy Security and Climate Change (2007 to 2008), jointly implemented by the U.S. Council on Environmental Quality (CEQ) and the National Security Council. He was a key contributor to the G-20 Major Economies Process and deliberations on the Energy Security Act of 2007. He was Associate Director at the CEQ (2004 to 2005) and professional staff in the Office of Science and Technology Policy (1986 to 1987).

Dixon was founding executive director, Secretariat for the International Partnership for the Hydrogen Economy (2003 to 2004)

At the International Energy Agency (2005 to 2007) of the Organisation for Economic Co-operation and Development, he was Head of Energy Technology Policy Division, strategizing and directing technology policy analyses for clients such as the G-20 Heads of State.

For the Global Environment Facility of The World Bank Group, Dixon was Team Leader for Climate Change and Chemicals (2008 to 2015), overseeing a multibillion-dollar portfolio of energy, environment, public health, infrastructure, and transportation projects in developing and transition countries.

=== International Agreements ===
Dixon has been a delegate to intergovernmental negotiating committees and subsidiary bodies of the United Nations Framework Convention on Climate Change (1992 to present), Montreal Protocol on Substances that Deplete the Ozone Layer (1989 to present), Minamata Convention on Mercury (2009 to 2015), the Asia-Pacific Partnership on Clean Development and Climate (2006 to 2011), the Stockholm Convention on Persistent Organic Pollutants (2004 to 2015), and United Nations Conference on Environment and Development (1992).

Dixon was a member of the United Nations Transitional Committee for the Green Climate Fund (2009 to 2012), advisor to the U.S. National Academy of Sciences and National Academy of Engineering (2002 to present) on energy and environmental projects, delegate to the Renewable Energy Policy Network for the 21st Century (REN21) (2004 to 2013), Commissioner General of the China World EXPO 2010 “Better City, Better Life" (2010), and Vice Chairman of the IEA Working Party on Renewable Energy Technologies (2001 to 2004).

He has briefed and testified before committees of the U.S. House of Representatives and U.S. Senate (1999 to present) on a wide variety of energy science and research issues, including U.S. energy technology transfer and climate change and technology policy options.

== Philanthropy ==
Dixon has been a strategic and tactical advisor aiding in the implementation of energy, environmental, and economic development and transition programs worldwide for Catholic Relief Services (1988), the Open Society Foundation (1994), the International Foundation for Science (1993 to 1998), CARE (1988), and others.

== Honors and awards ==
- The Nobel Peace Prize, December 10, 2007, awarded jointly to members of the Intergovernmental Panel on Climate Change
- Vice President’s Team Award, The World Bank Group, 2009 and 2013 for contributions to the United Nations FCCC and the Minamata Convention.
- Harvard University, John F. Kennedy School of Government Belfer Center Roy Family Award for Environmental Partnership, 2009
- U.S. Presidential Rank Award of Distinguished Executive, 2004
- U.S. Environmental Protection Agency, Bronze Medal for Commendable Service, 1993
- Fellowships: Smithsonian Fellowship, 1985.; Exxon, 1984
