= Taylor Bowlin =

American soccer player

Personal information
- Full name: Taylor Christopher Bowlin
- Date of birth: January 18, 1991 (age 35)
- Place of birth: Lee's Summit, Missouri, U.S.
- Height: 1.77 m (5 ft 9 1/2 in)
- Position: Defender

Team information
- Current team: Pars FC Örebro
- Number: 24

Youth career
- 2008–2009: Real Salt Lake
- 2009: UNLV Rebels
- 2010–2012: Cal State Northridge Matadors

Senior career*
Years	Team	Apps	(Gls)
2009–2010	Ogden Outlaws	14	(0)
2011	Kansas City Brass	15	(2)
2012	Real Salt Lake	15	(2)
2012	AC Barnechea	15	(0)
2014	Dayton Dutch Lions	16	(0)
2015–	Pars FC Örebro	11	(0)
Total		86	(2)
- * Club domestic league appearances and goals

Taylor Bowlin (born January 18, 1991) is an American former professional soccer player. He retired upon finishing his last season playing for Pars FC Örebro in the Swedish Football Association.

== Career ==
=== College and amateur ===
Bowlin started his college soccer career in 2009 at UNLV before transferring to Cal State Northridge in 2010.

While at college, Bowlin also appeared for USL PDL club's Ogden Outlaws and Kansas City Brass, as well as NPSL club San Diego Flash in 2013.

=== Professional ===
Bowlin spent time with Major League Soccer club Real Salt Lake and Primera B de Chile club A.C. Barnechea of Santiago, Chile before signing with USL Pro club Dayton Dutch Lions on March 24, 2014. He received an Honorable Mention for week 23 of the 2014 USL Pro season.
