= John Hardy (jewelry) =

Jewelry company of Indonesia

- Industry: Jewelers
- Founded: 1975; 51 years ago in Bali, Indonesia
- Headquarters: New York
- Key people: Matt Tepper, President; Reed Krakoff, Creative chairman John Hardy, Founder
- Products: Jewelry
- Website: johnhardy.com

John Hardy is a jewelry company of Indonesia.

== History ==
John Hardy jewelry was founded in 1975 by Canadian designer John Hardy. He visited Bali in the mid-1970s and the island's jewelry-making traditions raised his interest. He began learning the techniques of the local artisans then developed his first pieces by applying new design concepts to traditional Balinese techniques.

The John Hardy compound was built in Mambal, Bali in 1996 and is the company production center where the jewelry is created. It also is a living and gathering space with an organic farm and low impact buildings.

In 1999, Guy Bedarida, a senior designer of haute joaillerie of the Place Vendôme, joined the company as Head Designer and expanded Hardy’s design concepts to include the use of classical European jewelry techniques and new motifs inspired by nature and ancient East Asian art styles and themes.

In 2007, then John Hardy president Damien Dernoncourt, with Head Designer and creative director, Bedarida, purchased the company from Hardy. That same year the company headquarters was moved to Hong Kong and a satellite office was opened in New York.

The company opened its first flagship store in Plaza Indonesia, Jakarta in 2010. In 2011, it opened its first store at The Landmark, Hong Kong. In 2014, two more stores were opened in Bali, Indonesia.

On July 31, 2014, John Hardy announced that Robert Hanson, former CEO of American Eagle Outfitters, Inc., was appointed CEO.

Hollie Bonneville Barden joined John Hardy as Creative Director in 2016 and launched her first collection for the brand in Fall 2017. She studied jewelry design at Central Saint Martins and the Wimbledon School of Art. Prior to joining John Hardy, she held design roles at several boutique jewelry brands and later worked for a high jewelry house within the LVMH portfolio. She currently oversees the development of John Hardy's collections and leads the brand's team of artisans.

Summer 2016, John Hardy opened its first U.S. boutique in Houston. The brand opened its second US boutique in Manhattan at 118 Prince Street, between Greene and Wooster streets in SoHo.

John Hardy opened boutiques in Century City, Aventura, South Coast Plaza, The Forum Shops at Caesars Palace alongside premium outlets at Woodbury Commons and Desert Hills. Their jewelry can also be found at locations in the Caribbean, Indonesia, Hong Kong, and Korea through major department stores.

As of April 24, 2019, John Hardy announced the advancement of three executives. CEO Robert Hanson became Non-Executive Chairman; Kareem Gahed, who was Chief Revenue Officer, became CEO, and Audrey Finci, who was COO/CFO, became President - COO/CFO.

On September 14, 2022 Reed Krakoff was appointed Creative Chairman and also Strategic Advisor to L Catterton, John Hardy's majority shareholder and the largest global consumer-focused private equity firm to oversee the creative and artistic direction of the business with a focus on accelerating the growth of the John Hardy brand.

On August 1, 2023, John Hardy named Jan-Patrick Schmitz as Chief Executive Officer.

== Designs ==
John Hardy jewelry is known for its artisanal handcrafted designs using reclaimed sterling silver and gold, using traditional Balinese jewelry-making techniques that have been passed down through many generations. All of their Diamonds are sourced following the United Nations' resolution and the Kimberley Process, and gemstones, along with other natural materials, are sourced following their Ethical Sourcing Code of Conduct.

== Environmental and social consciousness ==
"Greener Every Day" is a company slogan used to summarize and describe its efforts to be a "green" company (the ultimate goal being to become carbon neutral). In 2006, John Hardy launched its "Sustainable Advertising" program to offset the carbon emissions from its print advertising, business travel and electricity consumption. It does so by planting bamboo on Bali and Nusa Penida, a small island off the coast of Bali. Through its "Wear Bamboo, Plant Bamboo" program, a portion of the proceeds from the sale of its Bamboo collection items are used to fund the company’s continuous bamboo plantings.

== Acquisition by L Catterton Partners Equity Firm ==
On July 31, 2014 L Catterton Partners, a private equity firm associated with LVMH, acquired John Hardy.
