= Lee's Summit High School =

Location
- 400 SE Blue Parkway; Lee's Summit, Missouri 64063; United States; 38°54′15″N 94°21′59″W

Information
- Type: Public
- Established: 1953
- School district: Lee's Summit R-VII School District
- NCES District ID: 2918300
- Principal: Nathan Muckey
- Teaching staff: 149.84 (on an FTE basis)
- Enrollment: 1,989 (2024-2025)
- Student to teacher ratio: 13.27
- Nickname: Tigers
- Colors: Black and gold
- Website: lshs.lsr7.org

Lee's Summit High School is a high school in Lee's Summit, Missouri, United States. It is located near downtown Lee's Summit on Blue Parkway, next to the intersection of U.S. Route 50 and Route 291. It is one of three high schools in the Lee's Summit R-VII School District.

== History ==
The original building, built in 1953 using military surplus paint, has been added onto throughout the years. The first addition in 1963 was built to house freshmen and sophomores. Later, a Field-house and Performing Arts center were added (1963 and 1979 respectively). A corridor connecting the cafeteria and the "B Building" was then added (this glass hallway is referred to as "the Breezeway"). A major addition, including a lecture hall was completed during the 2000-01 school year. Recently, a weight room was added during the 2009-2010 school year.

== Academics ==
Lee's Summit is an A+ designated high school. LSHS has received prestigious honors, including the Missouri Gold Star School award for 3 years and a U.S. News & World Report "Best High School" in 2009, 2010, 2011 and 2012.

== Extracurricular activities ==
Lee's Summit High School has an Air Force Junior ROTC program, which has been awarded AFJROTC Distinguished Unit many times, most recent being the 2017-2018 school year. LSHS AFJROTC also has different types of activities such as Raider Team, Drill Team, and Honor Guard. The Honor Guard team has presented the colors in many NCAA Sport Tournaments, the 2016 Ringside World Boxing Championship, and recent NASCAR races.

== Notable alumni ==
- Danielle Adams (class of 2007), former WNBA player
- Felix Anudike-Uzomah, Kansas City Chiefs (Class of 2020), defensive end
- Johnny Brackins (class of 2021), track & field athlete
- Rick Brattin, politician
- Paul Coverdell (Class of 1957), U.S. Senator
- Robert K. Dixon, member of the Intergovernmental Panel on Climate Change
- Forrest Griffith, former professional football player
- KC Lightfoot (Class of 2018), 2020 Olympics Track and field, pole vaulter
- Angela Lindvall (Class of 1997), fashion model
- Audrey Lindvall (Class of 2001), fashion model
- Drew Lock (Class of 2015), NFL quarterback, 1 × Super Bowl champion
- Mike Metheny (Class of 1967), trumpeter, educator
- Pat Metheny (Class of 1972), Grammy Award-winning jazz guitarist
- Bruce Polen, college football player and coach
- Matt Tegenkamp (Class of 2000), former Olympian
