= Mitchell Tinsley =

American football player (born 1999)

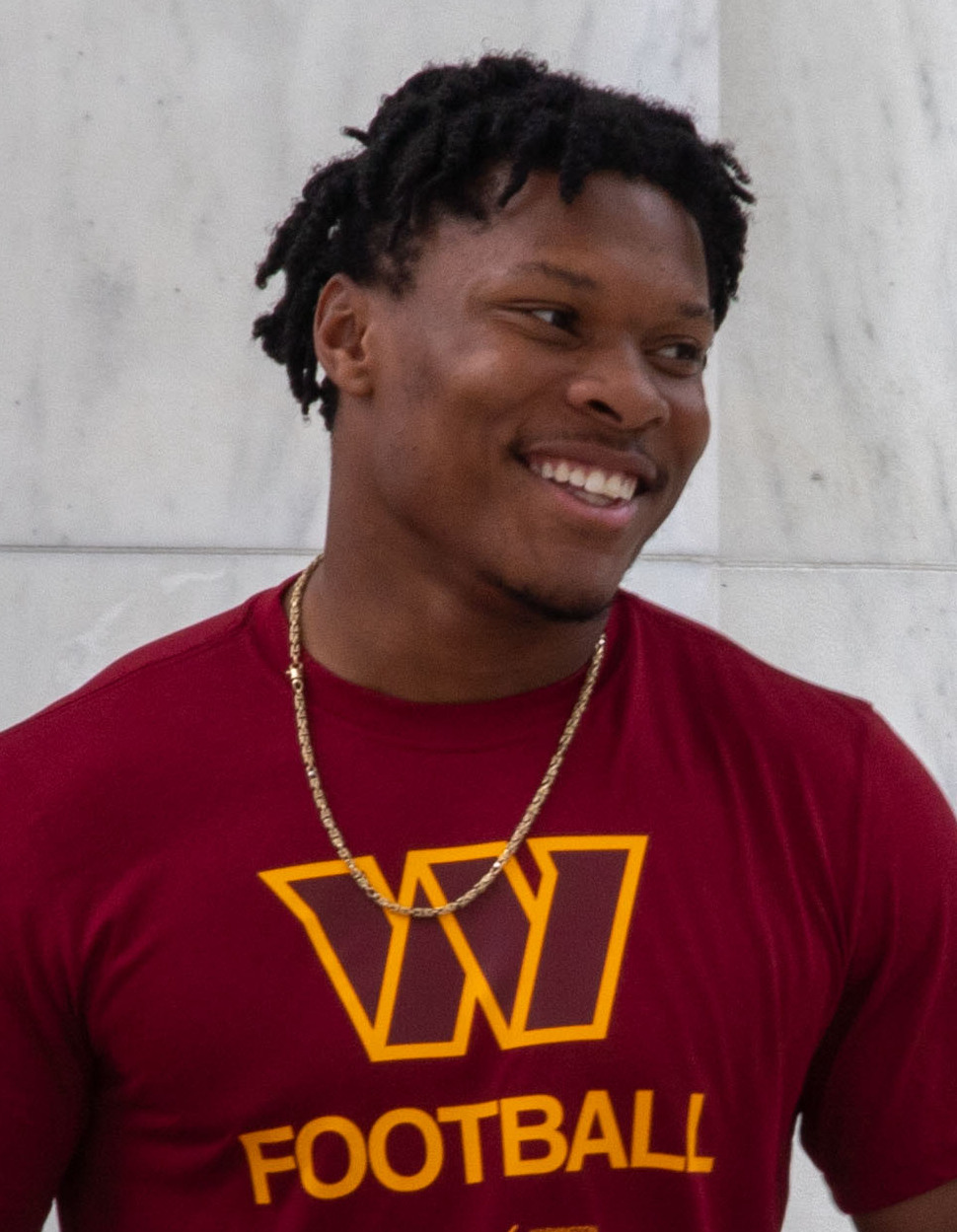
- Tinsley with the Washington Commanders in 2023

No. 82 – Cincinnati Bengals
- Position: Wide receiver
- Roster status: Active

Personal information
- Born: September 15, 1999 (age 27); Lee's Summit, Missouri, U.S.
- Listed height: 6 ft 1 in (1.85 m)
- Listed weight: 205 lb (93 kg)

Career information
- High school: Lee's Summit
- College: Hutchinson CC (2018–2019); Western Kentucky (2020–2021); Penn State (2022)
- NFL draft: 2023: undrafted

Career history
- Washington Commanders (2023–2024); Cincinnati Bengals (2025); Houston Texans (2026)*; Cincinnati Bengals (2026–present)
- * Offseason or practice squad member only

Awards and highlights
- Second-team All-C-USA (2021)

Career NFL statistics as of Week 7, 2026
- Receptions: 12
- Receiving yards: 172
- Receiving touchdowns: 2
- Return yards: 10
- Stats at Pro Football Reference

Mitchell Anthony Robert Tinsley (born September 15, 1999) is an American professional football wide receiver for the Cincinnati Bengals of the National Football League (NFL). He played college football for the Hutchinson Blue Dragons, Western Kentucky Hilltoppers, and Penn State Nittany Lions. Tinsley signed with the Washington Commanders as an undrafted free agent in 2023.

== Early life ==
Tinsley was born on September 15, 1999, in Lee's Summit, Missouri. He attended Lee's Summit High School, where he only played one year of football, recording 19 receptions for 350 yards and six touchdowns as a senior.

== College career ==
=== Hutchinson Community College ===
Tinsley attended Hutchinson Community College in Hutchinson, Kansas for two years, recording 57 receptions for 656 yards and four touchdowns for the Blue Dragons.

=== Western Kentucky ===
In 2020, Tinsley transferred to Western Kentucky University to play for the Hilltoppers. In his first year there, he had 43 receptions for 377 yards and four touchdowns. As a 14-game starter in 2021, Tinsley had 87 receptions for 1,402 yards and 14 touchdowns.

=== Penn State ===
In 2022, Tinsley transferred to Penn State to play for the Nittany Lions. In his first game at Penn State, he had seven receptions for 84 yards and a touchdown. In 13 starts, Tinsley recorded 51 receptions for 577 yards and 5 touchdowns.

== Professional career ==
Pre-draft measurables
Height	Weight	Arm length	Hand span	Wingspan	40-yard dash	10-yard split	20-yard split	20-yard shuttle	Three-cone drill	Vertical jump	Broad jump	Bench press
6 ft 0 in (1.83 m)	199 lb (90 kg)	32 3/8 in (0.82 m)	10 in (0.25 m)	6 ft 3 5/8 in (1.92 m)	4.59 s	1.60 s	2.63 s	4.14 s	6.70 s	35.5 in (0.90 m)	10 ft 0 in (3.05 m)	14 reps
All values from NFL Combine/Pro Day

=== Washington Commanders ===
Tinsley signed with the Washington Commanders as an undrafted free agent on May 1, 2023. He was waived by the team on August 27, 2024, and joined their practice squad the following day.

=== Cincinnati Bengals (first stint) ===
Tinsley signed a futures contract with the Cincinnati Bengals on February 4, 2025. Tinsley played with the Bengals against the Washington Commanders in Week 2 of the preseason, scoring two touchdowns to help win 31-17. Tinsley ultimately made the final 53-man roster. His first career catch was a game-tying one-handed touchdown reception in an eventual victory against the Jacksonville Jaguars. Tinsley played in all 17 games for Cincinnati (including four starts), recording eight receptions for 116 yards and two touchdowns.

On January 5, 2026, the Bengals signed Tinsley to a one-year contract extension. On August 30, he was waived by Cincinnati as a part of final roster cuts.

=== Houston Texans ===
On September 1, 2026, Tinsley was signed to the Houston Texans' practice squad.

=== Cincinnati Bengals (second stint) ===
On September 29, 2026, Tinsley was signed by the Cincinnati Bengals off of the Texans practice squad.
