= Guy Bedarida =

French jewelry designer

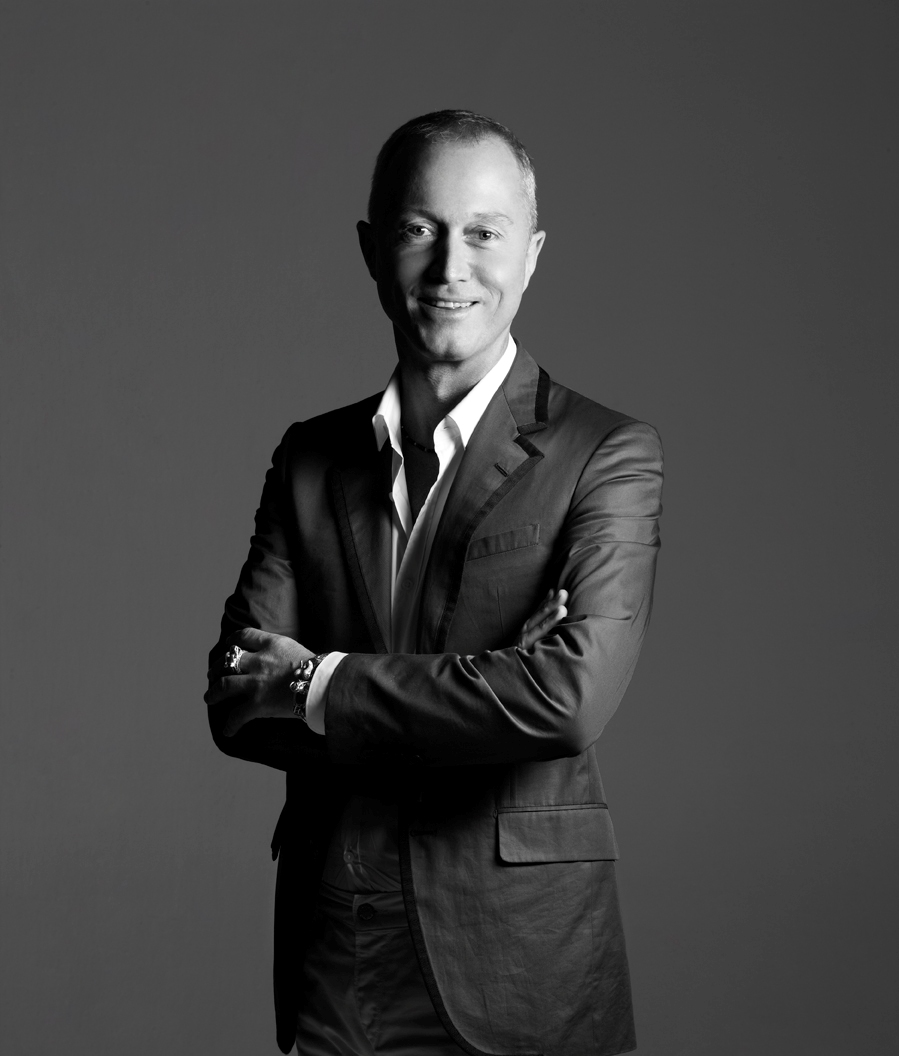
- Born: 1963 (age 62–63)
- Occupation: Jewelry designer

Guy Bedarida (born 1963) is an Italian-born French jewelry designer, former Head Designer for the American branch of Van Cleef & Arpels and former Creative Director and Head Designer for the John Hardy brand. His work is colorful and references European and Asian design traditions.

Bedarida, who is of French-Italian parentage, grew up between Tuscany, Rome, and Paris. He was educated at the European Institute of Design and Communication in Rome, where he majored in jewelry and fashion design. He started out working as a jewelry designer on the Place Vendôme in Paris, most notably for the house of Boucheron. Afterwards, he became Head Designer for the American branch of Van Cleef and Arpels, where his exclusive and unique designs were worn by movie stars and celebrities.

Bedarida joined the John Hardy group in the late 1990s as Head Designer and Creative Director. He worked at the John Hardy design center in Bali, directing a team of illustrators, wax-carvers, metal-smiths and stone-cutters, whose skilled handiwork helped him realise new designs and technical improvements. Bedarida created some of John Hardy’s best-selling collections, including one inspired by the Nāga. In 2007, Bedarida joined a management buyout of the John Hardy brand which was eventually sold in 2014.

In July 2017 Guy Bedarida bought and became the majority owner and Creative Director of the legendary high jewelry brand Marina B. Marina B was created by Marina Bulgari in the 70’s, she was born in the third generation of the famous family of Bulgari jewelers established in Rome since 1881.
