= Upper Souris National Wildlife Refuge =

Protected area in North Dakota, United States

- IUCN category IV (habitat/species management area)
- Location within the United States
- Location: Renville, Ward counties, North Dakota, United States
- Nearest city: Minot, North Dakota
- Coordinates: 48°36′00″N 101°37′02″W
- Area: 32,092 acres (129.87 km^{2})
- Established: 1935
- Governing body: U.S. Fish and Wildlife Service
- Website: Upper Souris National Wildlife Refuge

Upper Souris National Wildlife Refuge, located 30 miles (48 km) northwest of Minot, North Dakota, was established in 1935 as a refuge and breeding ground for migratory birds and other wildlife. The refuge straddles 35 miles (56 km) of the picturesque Souris River valley in northern North Dakota. The Souris River basin figures prominently in the cultural and natural history of the North American mid-continent plains and prairies.

The 32,092-acre (129.87 km^{2}) refuge includes a narrow band of river bottom woodlands, fertile floodplains, native mixed-grass hills, and steep, shrub-covered coulees. The focal point of the refuge is the 9,600-acre (39 km^{2}) Lake Darling, a reservoir created by the Lake Darling Dam, which was constructed in 1936 to provide water to downstream marshes on J. Clark Salyer and Upper Souris National Wildlife Refuges.

The American Bird Conservancy has designated the refuge as a Globally Important Bird Area. Lake Darling is also designated as critical habitat for the endangered piping plover.

Bird watchers come from across the nation to search for small grassland nesting bird species including Baird's, Le Conte's, and Nelson's sharp-tailed sparrows, as well as the Sprague's pipit.

== See also ==
- Lower Souris National Wildlife Refuge Airplane Hangar
