= McHenry County, North Dakota =

County in North Dakota, United States

- County
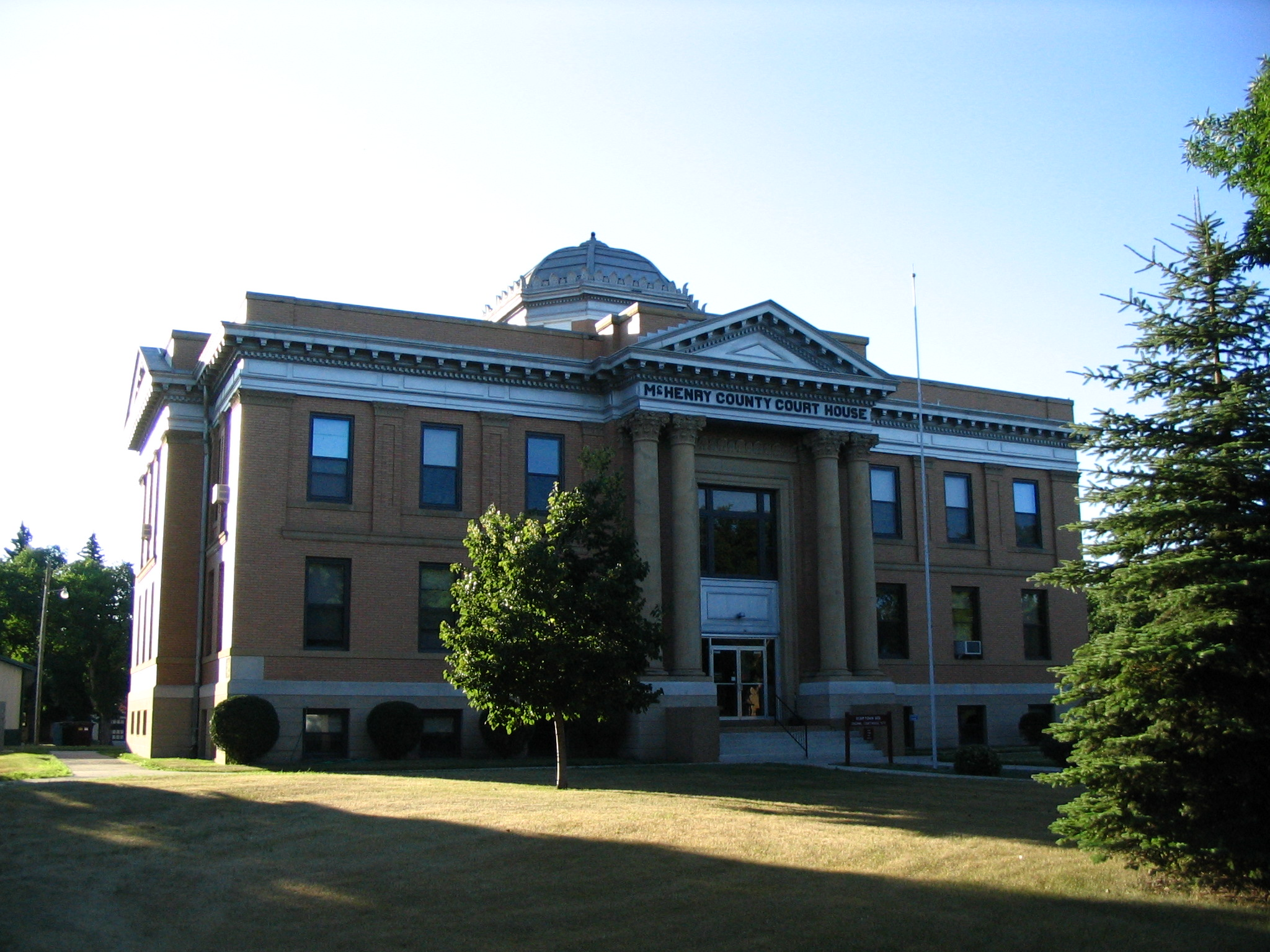
- The McHenry County Courthouse in Towner

- Location within the U.S. state of North Dakota
- Coordinates: 48.233842°N 100.633267°W
- Country: United States
- State: North Dakota
- Founded: January 4, 1873 (created); October 15, 1884 (organized)
- Seat: Towner
- Largest city: Velva

Area
  - Total: 1,911.519 sq mi (4,950.81 km^{2})
  - Land: 1,873.942 sq mi (4,853.49 km^{2})
  - Water: 37.577 sq mi (97.32 km^{2}) 1.97%

Population (2020)
  - Total: 5,345
  - Estimate (2025): 5,130 ▼
  - Density: 2.74/sq mi (1.06/km^{2})
- Time zone: UTC−6 (Central)
  - Summer (DST): UTC−5 (CDT)
- Area code: 701
- Congressional district: At-large
- Website: www.mchenrycountynd.gov

McHenry County is a county in the U.S. state of North Dakota. As of the 2020 census, the population was 5,345. The county seat is Towner, and largest city is Velva.

McHenry County is part of the Minot metropolitan area.

== History ==
The Dakota Territory legislature created the county on January 4, 1873, with territory annexed from Bottineau County. It was named for James McHenry, an early settler of Vermillion (in present South Dakota). The county government was not organized at that time, nor was the county attached to another county for administrative and judicial purposes. The county organization was effected on October 15, 1884. The county boundaries were altered in 1885, 1887, 1891, and in 1892. It has retained its present boundaries since 1892.

When the county was organized in 1884, Villard was named as county seat. In 1885 this designation was moved to Scriptown. In 1886 the designation was again moved, to Towner, which has remained the seat to the present time (the two former sites are now ghost towns).

== Geography ==
The Souris River loops through the county before turning north to its eventual discharge into Lake Winnipeg. The Wintering River drains the southern part of the county. The county terrain consists of rolling hills, partly devoted to agriculture (including limited use of center pivot irrigation). The terrain slopes to the north and east, with its highest point on the west boundary line near the southwest corner, at 2,156 ft (657 m) ASL.

According to the United States Census Bureau, the county has a total area of 1,911.519 square miles (4,950.81 km^{2}), of which 1,873.942 square miles (4,853.49 km^{2}) is land and 37.577 square miles (97.32 km^{2}) (1.97%) is water. It is the 8th largest county in North Dakota by total area.

=== Major highways ===
- U.S. Highway 2
- U.S. Highway 52
- North Dakota Highway 14
- North Dakota Highway 19
- North Dakota Highway 23
- North Dakota Highway 41
- North Dakota Highway 53
- North Dakota Highway 97

=== Adjacent counties ===
- Bottineau County - north
- Pierce County - east
- Sheridan County - southeast
- McLean County - southwest
- Ward County - west
- Renville County - northwest

=== National protected areas ===
- Cottonwood Lake National Wildlife Refuge
- Denbigh Experimental Forest
- J. Clark Salyer National Wildlife Refuge (part)
- Wintering River National Wildlife Refuge

=== Lakes ===
- Bromley Lake
- Buffalo Lodge Lake
- Connia Slough
- Erickson Lake
- Heringen Lake
- Horseshoe Lake (part)
- Lake George
- Lake Hester
- Lauinger Lake
- Martin Lake
- North Lake
- Potters Lake
- Round Lake
- Smoky Lake (part)
- Stevens Slough
- Stink Lake

== Demographics ==
Historical population
Census	Pop.	Note	%±
1890	1,584		—
1900	5,253		231.6%
1910	17,627		235.6%
1920	15,544		−11.8%
1930	15,439		−0.7%
1940	14,034		−9.1%
1950	12,556		−10.5%
1960	11,099		−11.6%
1970	8,977		−19.1%
1980	7,858		−12.5%
1990	6,528		−16.9%
2000	5,987		−8.3%
2010	5,395		−9.9%
2020	5,345		−0.9%
2025 (est.)	5,130	▼	−4.0%
U.S. Decennial Census; 1790–1960 1900–1990; 1990–2000 2010–2020

As of the fourth quarter of 2024, the median home value in McHenry County was $151,728.

=== 2020 census ===
As of the 2020 census, the county had a population of 5,345. Of the residents, 23.3% were under the age of 18 and 22.5% were 65 years of age or older; the median age was 44.5 years. For every 100 females there were 108.0 males, and for every 100 females age 18 and over there were 106.8 males.

The racial makeup of the county was 94.6% White, 0.2% Black or African American, 0.5% American Indian and Alaska Native, 0.2% Asian, 0.5% from some other race, and 3.9% from two or more races. Hispanic or Latino residents of any race comprised 1.8% of the population.

There were 2,292 households in the county, of which 26.4% had children under the age of 18 living with them and 18.4% had a female householder with no spouse or partner present. About 31.5% of all households were made up of individuals and 16.2% had someone living alone who was 65 years of age or older.

There were 2,818 housing units, of which 18.7% were vacant. Among occupied housing units, 84.0% were owner-occupied and 16.0% were renter-occupied. The homeowner vacancy rate was 2.3% and the rental vacancy rate was 14.8%.

=== 2010 census ===
As of the census of 2010, there were 5,395 people, 2,377 households, and 1,527 families in the county. The population density was 2.88 people per square mile (1.11 people/km^{2}). There were 2,948 housing units at an average density of 1.57 units per square mile (0.61/km^{2}). The racial makeup of the county was 97.8% white, 0.6% American Indian, 0.3% Asian, 0.1% black or African American, 0.3% from other races, and 0.9% from two or more races. Those of Hispanic or Latino origin made up 1.5% of the population. In terms of ancestry, 55.3% were of German, 39.5% Norwegian, 5.3% English, 3.6% Swedish, 3.5% American, 2.4% Russian and 1.7% Dutch ancestry.

Of the 2,377 households, 25.3% had children under the age of 18 living with them, 53.9% were married couples living together, 5.8% had a female householder with no husband present, 35.8% were non-families, and 31.3% of all households were made up of individuals. The average household size was 2.25 and the average family size was 2.81. The median age was 46.2 years.

The median income for a household in the county was $36,944 and the median income for a family was $54,350. Males had a median income of $36,625 versus $26,205 for females. The per capita income for the county was $22,911. About 6.4% of families and 12.3% of the population were below the poverty line, including 17.1% of those under age 18 and 17.9% of those age 65 or over.

== Communities ==
=== Cities ===
- Anamoose
- Balfour
- Bergen
- Deering
- Drake
- Granville
- Karlsruhe
- Kief
- Towner (county seat)
- Upham
- Velva
- Voltaire

=== Census-designated place ===
- Bantry (former city)

=== Unincorporated communities ===
- Berwick
- Cole Ford
- Denbigh
- Funston
- Genoa
- Guthrie
- Kottkethal
- Milroy
- Newport
- Norfolk
- Norwich
- Rangeley
- Riga
- Rising
- Rose Hill
- Simcoe
- Verendrye
- Willowdale
- Willow Vale
- Willow Valley
- Willow Creek

=== Townships ===
- Anamoose
- Balfour
- Bantry
- Berwick
- Bjornson
- Brown
- Cottonwood Lake
- Deep River
- Deering
- Denbigh
- Egg Creek
- Falsen
- Gilmore
- Granville
- Grilley
- Hendrickson
- Karlsruhe
- Kottke Valley
- Lake George
- Lake Hester
- Land
- Layton
- Lebanon
- Little Deep
- Meadow
- Mouse River
- Newport
- Normal
- North Prairie
- Norwich
- Odin
- Olivia
- Pratt
- Riga
- Rose Hill
- Round Lake
- Saline
- Schiller
- Spring Grove
- Strege
- Velva
- Villard
- Voltaire
- Wagar
- Willow Creek

== Notable people ==
- Sondre Norheim, pioneer of modern skiing
- Cordell Volson, professional football player

== Politics ==
McHenry County voters have traditionally voted Republican. In only one national election since 1936 has the county selected the Democratic Party candidate. In 2024, Donald Trump received the highest percentage of the vote for any presidential candidate in McHenry County's history, receiving over 80% of the vote, breaking his own record that he set in 2020.

United States presidential election results for McHenry County, North Dakota
Year	Republican		Democratic		Third party(ies)	
Year	No.	%	No.	%	No.	%
1900	595	70.00%	222	26.12%	33	3.88%
1904	1,807	73.54%	556	22.63%	94	3.83%
1908	1,772	56.16%	1,296	41.08%	87	2.76%
1912	589	23.61%	959	38.44%	947	37.96%
1916	692	31.33%	1,316	59.57%	201	9.10%
1920	3,534	74.09%	848	17.78%	388	8.13%
1924	1,692	36.89%	264	5.76%	2,631	57.36%
1928	2,914	53.04%	2,535	46.14%	45	0.82%
1932	1,396	25.08%	3,937	70.73%	233	4.19%
1936	1,619	26.24%	3,294	53.40%	1,256	20.36%
1940	3,894	63.07%	2,225	36.04%	55	0.89%
1944	3,141	61.44%	1,934	37.83%	37	0.72%
1948	2,578	56.45%	1,770	38.76%	219	4.80%
1952	4,227	76.60%	1,228	22.25%	63	1.14%
1956	3,019	62.12%	1,825	37.55%	16	0.33%
1960	2,715	54.87%	2,231	45.09%	2	0.04%
1964	1,728	39.46%	2,643	60.36%	8	0.18%
1968	2,226	54.21%	1,595	38.85%	285	6.94%
1972	2,765	63.62%	1,554	35.76%	27	0.62%
1976	2,043	49.70%	1,994	48.50%	74	1.80%
1980	2,922	71.20%	939	22.88%	243	5.92%
1984	2,485	65.38%	1,283	33.75%	33	0.87%
1988	1,888	52.69%	1,665	46.47%	30	0.84%
1992	1,321	38.90%	1,173	34.54%	902	26.56%
1996	1,187	43.07%	1,096	39.77%	473	17.16%
2000	1,682	61.45%	888	32.44%	167	6.10%
2004	1,744	61.84%	1,030	36.52%	46	1.63%
2008	1,374	56.87%	981	40.60%	61	2.52%
2012	1,678	61.87%	943	34.77%	91	3.36%
2016	2,050	72.70%	490	17.38%	280	9.93%
2020	2,364	78.72%	564	18.78%	75	2.50%
2024	2,223	80.78%	479	17.41%	50	1.82%

== See also ==
- National Register of Historic Places listings in McHenry County, North Dakota
