= 2024 Cincinnati Bengals season =

57th season in franchise history; 55th season in the National Football League

- Owner: Mike Brown
- Head coach: Zac Taylor
- Home stadium: Paycor Stadium

Results
- Record: 9–8
- Division place: 3rd AFC North
- Playoffs: Did not qualify
- All-Pros: WR Ja'Marr Chase (1st team); EDGE Trey Hendrickson (1st team)
- Pro Bowlers: QB Joe Burrow; WR Ja'Marr Chase; DE Trey Hendrickson

Uniform
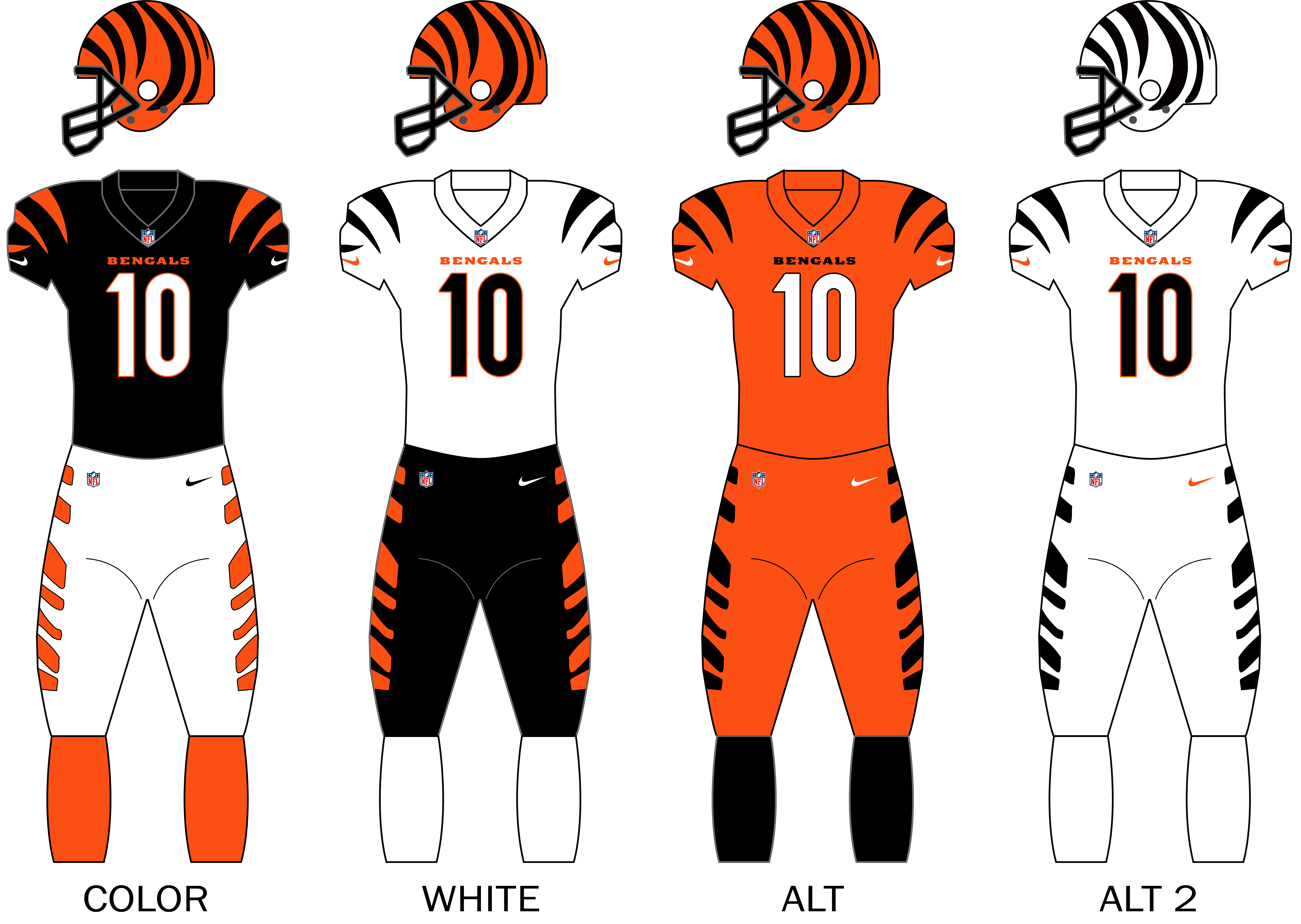

The 2024 season was the Cincinnati Bengals' 55th in the National Football League (NFL), their 57th overall, their 25th playing their home games at Paycor Stadium and their sixth under head coach Zac Taylor.

Despite a 4–8 start, their worst since 2020, the Bengals rallied to win their final five games of the season and remain in playoff contention late in the season. However, they were eliminated from playoff contention for the second consecutive season when the Denver Broncos defeated the Kansas City Chiefs in Week 18. The season was largely defined by stellar offensive play along with poor defensive play. On the offensive side of the ball, Joe Burrow led the league in passing yards and passing touchdowns and was responsible for the Bengals having the best passing offense. Wide receiver Ja'Marr Chase led all other receivers in receiving yards, receptions, and receiving touchdowns, becoming the 7th wide receiver to win the triple crown in the Super Bowl era. On the defensive side, the Bengals, despite having the league's sack leader Trey Hendrickson, had the 7th-worst scoring defense, allowing 30 or more points in six of their games, and were 4–7 in one-score games. They also set an NFL record for most losses while still scoring 30 or more points in a single game, with four. This included two late double-digit comebacks by their divisional rival, the Baltimore Ravens, in both games played. Defensive coordinator Lou Anarumo was let go by the team following the end of the season.

== Offseason ==
=== Free agents ===
As of June 17, 2024

==== Unrestricted ====
Position	Player	2024 Team	Date signed	Contract
CB	Chidobe Awuzie	Tennessee Titans	March 11	3 years, $36 million
LB	Joe Bachie	Cincinnati Bengals	April 15	1 year, $1.275 million
LB	Markus Bailey	Arizona Cardinals	May 7	1 year, $1.275 million
WR	Tyler Boyd	Tennessee Titans	May 7	1 year, $4.5 million
LB	Akeem Davis-Gaither	Cincinnati Bengals	March 11	1 year, $2.742 million
G	Cody Ford	Cincinnati Bengals	March 9	1 year, $1.35 million
WR	Tee Higgins	Cincinnati Bengals	June 17	1 year, $21.8 million (Franchise Tag)
QB	A.J. McCarron			
DT	D.J. Reader	Detroit Lions	March 14	2 years, $22 million
TE	Drew Sample	Cincinnati Bengals	March 11	3 years, $10.5 million
G	Max Scharping	Philadelphia Eagles	June 3	1 year
TE	Irv Smith Jr.	Kansas City Chiefs	March 12	1 year, $1.292 million
DT	Josh Tupou	Baltimore Ravens	May 28	1 year, $1.275 million
T	Jonah Williams	Arizona Cardinals	March 13	2 years, $30 million
RB	Trayveon Williams	Cincinnati Bengals	March 11	1 year, $1.292 million

==== Restricted ====
Position	Player	2024 Team	Date signed	Contract
TE	Tanner Hudson	Cincinnati Bengals	March 15	1 year, $1.292 million
WR	Trenton Irwin	Cincinnati Bengals	March 15	1 year, $2 million
TE	Mitchell Wilcox	New England Patriots	April 22	1 year, $1.075 million

==== Exclusive rights ====
Position	Player	2024 Team	Date signed	Contract
LS	Cal Adomitis	Cincinnati Bengals	April 15	1 year, $985k
QB	Jake Browning	Cincinnati Bengals	April 23	2 years

=== Signings ===
Position	Player	2023 Team	Date signed	Contract
S	Geno Stone	Baltimore Ravens	March 11	2 years, $14 million
RB	Zack Moss	Indianapolis Colts	March 11	2 years, $8 million
TE	Mike Gesicki	New England Patriots	March 12	1 year, $2.25 million
DT	Sheldon Rankins	Houston Texans	March 13	2 years, $24.5 million
S	Vonn Bell	Carolina Panthers	March 14	1 year, $6 million
OT	Trent Brown	New England Patriots	March 19	1 year, $4.75 million
QB	Logan Woodside	Atlanta Falcons	April 23	1 year, $1.125 million

=== Releases ===
Position	Player	Date released	2024 Team	Date signed	Contract
S	Nick Scott	March 13	Carolina Panthers	March 22	1 year, $1.292 million

=== Trades ===
- March 12 – Running back Joe Mixon was traded to the Houston Texans for a seventh-round pick (No. 224 overall; originally acquired from the Arizona Cardinals).

== Draft ==
2024 Cincinnati Bengals draft selections
Round	Selection	Player	Position	College	Notes
1	18	Amarius Mims	OT	Georgia	
2	49	Kris Jenkins Jr.	DT	Michigan	
3	80	Jermaine Burton	WR	Alabama	
3	97	McKinnley Jackson	DT	Texas A&M	Compensatory selection
4	115	Erick All	TE	Iowa	
5	149	Josh Newton	CB	TCU	
6	194	Tanner McLachlan	TE	Arizona	
6	214	Cedric Johnson	DE	Mississippi	Compensatory selection
7	224	Daijahn Anthony	S	Mississippi	From Texans (Note: The Bengals traded RB Joe Mixon to the Houston Texans in exchange for a seventh-round selection (224th overall).)
7	237	Matt Lee	C	Miami	

Draft trades

2024 Cincinnati Bengals undrafted free agents
Name	Position	College	Ref.
Justin Blazek	DE	UW–Platteville	
Cole Burgess	WR	Cortland	
Noah Cain	RB	LSU	
Aaron Casey	LB	Indiana	
Elijah Collins	RB	Oklahoma State	
Michael Dowell	S	Miami (OH)	
Cam Grandy	TE	Illinois State	
P. J. Jules	S	Southern Illinois	
Rocky Lombardi	QB	Northern Illinois	
Austin McNamara	P	Texas Tech	
Eric Miller	OT	Louisville	
Tre Mosley	WR	Michigan State	
Maema Njongmeta	LB	Wisconsin	
Lance Robinson	CB	Tulane	

== Staff ==
2024 Cincinnati Bengals staff
Front office: Owner/president – Mike Brown; Executive vice president – Katie Blackburn; Vice president – Troy Blackburn; Vice president of player personnel – Paul H. Brown; Director of player personnel – Duke Tobin; Senior personnel executive – Trey Brown; College scouting director – Mike Potts; Pro scouting director – Steven Radicivec; Head coaches: Head coach – Zac Taylor; Assistant head coach/special teams coordinator – Darrin Simmons; Offensive coaches: Offensive coordinator – Dan Pitcher; Passing game coordinator – Justin Rascati; Quarterbacks – Brad Kragthorpe; Assistant quarterbacks – Fredi Knighten; Running backs – Justin Hill; Wide receivers – Troy Walters; Tight ends – James Casey; Offensive line/run game coordinator – Frank Pollack; Assistant offensive line – Derek Frazier; Offensive assistant – Jordan Salkin	Defensive coaches: Defensive coordinator – Lou Anarumo; Defensive line – Marion Hobby; Linebackers – James Bettcher; Secondary/cornerbacks – Charles Burks; Secondary/safeties – Jordan Kovacs; Senior defensive assistant – Mark Duffner; Defensive quality control – Louie Cioffi; Defensive assistant – Ronnie Regula; Special teams coaches: Assistant special teams – Ben Jacobs; Strength and conditioning: Strength and conditioning – Joey Boese; Assistant strength and conditioning – Todd Hunt; Assistant strength and conditioning – Garrett Swanson; Chief of coaching staff – Doug Rosfeld; Consultant – Jim McNally

== Final roster ==
2024 Cincinnati Bengals roster
Quarterbacks (QB): 6 Jake Browning; 9 Joe Burrow; Running backs (RB): 30 Chase Brown; 34 Khalil Herbert; 36 Kendall Milton; 32 Trayveon Williams; Wide receivers (WR): 81 Jermaine Burton; 1 Ja'Marr Chase; 5 Tee Higgins; 80 Andrei Iosivas; 15 Charlie Jones; 18 Isaiah Williams; Tight ends (TE): 88 Mike Gesicki; 85 Cam Grandy; 87 Tanner Hudson; 84 Tanner McLachlan; 89 Drew Sample	Offensive linemen (OL): 75 Orlando Brown T; 65 Alex Cappa G; 76 Devin Cochran T; 61 Cody Ford T/G; 64 Ted Karras C; 62 Matt Lee C; 71 Amarius Mims T; 73 Andrew Stueber T; 67 Cordell Volson G; Defensive linemen (DL): 91 Trey Hendrickson DE; 92 B. J. Hill DT; 94 Sam Hubbard DE; 93 McKinnley Jackson DT; 90 Kris Jenkins Jr. DT; 52 Cedric Johnson DE; 99 Myles Murphy DE; 58 Joseph Ossai DE; 51 Isaiah Thomas DE; 97 Jay Tufele DT	Linebackers (LB): 59 Akeem Davis-Gaither OLB; 50 Shaka Heyward MLB; 45 Maema Njongmeta MLB; 57 Germaine Pratt OLB; Defensive backs (DB): 26 Tycen Anderson FS; 33 Daijahn Anthony SS; 27 Jordan Battle SS; 24 Vonn Bell SS; 21 Mike Hilton CB; 38 D. J. Ivey CB; 28 Josh Newton CB; 22 Geno Stone FS; 29 Cam Taylor-Britt CB; 42 Marco Wilson CB; Special teams (ST): 48 Cal Adomitis LS; 8 Ryan Rehkow P; 3 Cade York K	Practice squad: 40 Micah Abraham CB; 44 Gary Brightwell RB; 41 Nate Brooks CB; 17 Cole Burgess WR; 79 Andrew Coker T; 72 Domenique Davis DT; 35 Jalen Davis CB; 63 Trey Hill C; 56 Raymond Johnson DE; 37 P. J. Jules SS; 43 Jaylen Key FS; 66 Tashawn Manning G; 19 Kendric Pryor WR; 11 Logan Woodside QB; 46 Craig Young OLB; Reserve: 83 Erick All TE (IR); 49 Joe Bachie MLB (IR); 77 Trent Brown T (IR); 25 Chris Evans RB (IR); 23 Daxton Hill CB (IR); 60 Jaxson Kirkland G (IR); 2 Evan McPherson K (IR); 31 Zack Moss RB (IR); 98 Sheldon Rankins DT (NF-Ill.); 39 Lance Robinson CB (IR); 96 Cameron Sample DE (IR); 70 D'Ante Smith T (IR); 20 DJ Turner CB (IR); 55 Logan Wilson OLB (IR); Rookies in italics 53 active, 14 reserve, 15 practice squad

== Preseason ==
Week	Date	Opponent	Result	Record	Venue	Recap
1	August 10	Tampa Bay Buccaneers	L 14–17	0–1	Paycor Stadium	Recap
2	August 17	at Chicago Bears	L 3–27	0–2	Soldier Field	Recap
3	August 22	Indianapolis Colts	L 14–27	0–3	Paycor Stadium	Recap

== Regular season ==
=== Schedule ===
Week	Date	Opponent	Result	Record	Venue	Recap
1	September 8	New England Patriots	**L** 10–16	0–1	Paycor Stadium	Recap
2	September 15	at Kansas City Chiefs	**L** 25–26	0–2	Arrowhead Stadium	Recap
3	September 23	Washington Commanders	**L** 33–38	0–3	Paycor Stadium	Recap
4	September 29	at Carolina Panthers	**W** 34–24	1–3	Bank of America Stadium	Recap
5	October 6	**Baltimore Ravens**	**L** 38–41 (OT)	1–4	Paycor Stadium	Recap
6	October 13	at New York Giants	**W** 17–7	2–4	MetLife Stadium	Recap
7	October 20	at **Cleveland Browns**	**W** 21–14	3–4	Huntington Bank Field	Recap
8	October 27	Philadelphia Eagles	**L** 17–37	3–5	Paycor Stadium	Recap
9	November 3	Las Vegas Raiders	**W** 41–24	4–5	Paycor Stadium	Recap
10	November 7	at **Baltimore Ravens**	**L** 34–35	4–6	M&T Bank Stadium	Recap
11	November 17	at Los Angeles Chargers	**L** 27–34	4–7	SoFi Stadium	Recap
12	Bye					
13	December 1	**Pittsburgh Steelers**	**L** 38–44	4–8	Paycor Stadium	Recap
14	December 9	at Dallas Cowboys	**W** 27–20	5–8	AT&T Stadium	Recap
15	December 15	at Tennessee Titans	**W** 37–27	6–8	Nissan Stadium	Recap
16	December 22	**Cleveland Browns**	**W** 24–6	7–8	Paycor Stadium	Recap
17	December 28	Denver Broncos	**W** 30–24 (OT)	8–8	Paycor Stadium	Recap
18	January 4	at **Pittsburgh Steelers**	**W** 19–17	9–8	Acrisure Stadium	Recap

Note: Intra-division opponents are in bold text.

=== Game summaries ===
==== Week 1: vs. New England Patriots ====
Week 1: New England Patriots at Cincinnati Bengals – Game summary

Quarter	1	2	3	4	Total
**Patriots**	0	10	3	3	**16**
Bengals	0	0	7	3	**10**

at Paycor Stadium, Cincinnati, Ohio

- Date: September 8
- Game time: 1:00 p.m. EDT
- Game weather: Sunny, 66 °F (19 °C)
- Game attendance: 66,214
- Referee: Land Clark
- TV announcers (CBS): Ian Eagle, Charles Davis, and Evan Washburn
- Recap, Game Book

Game information

**First quarter**

- No scoring plays.

**Second quarter**

- NE – Rhamondre Stevenson 3-yard run (Joey Slye kick), 14:58. Patriots 7–0. **Drive: 14 plays, 80 yards, 7:20.**
- NE – Joey Slye 32-yard field goal, 0:00. Patriots 10–0. **Drive: 12 plays, 68 yards, 5:09.**

**Third quarter**

- NE – Joey Slye 35-yard field goal, 11:34. Patriots 13–0. **Drive: 4 plays, 7 yards, 2:08.**
- CIN – Zack Moss 5-yard run (Evan McPherson kick), 1:10. Patriots 13–7. **Drive: 9 plays, 90 yards, 4:27.**

**Fourth quarter**

- NE – Joey Slye 37-yard field goal, 8:46. Patriots 16–7. **Drive: 12 plays, 52 yards, 7:24.**
- CIN – Evan McPherson 51-yard field goal, 6:14. Patriots 16–10. **Drive: 6 plays, 37 yards, 2:32.**

**Top passers**

- NE – Jacoby Brissett – 15/24, 121 yards
- CIN – Joe Burrow – 21/29, 164 yards

**Top rushers**

- NE – Rhamondre Stevenson – 25 rushes, 120 yards, TD
- CIN – Zack Moss – 9 rushes, 44 yards, TD

**Top receivers**

- NE – Austin Hooper – 2 receptions, 31 yards
- CIN – Ja'Marr Chase – 6 receptions, 62 yards

The Bengals started their season at home against the Patriots. After a scoreless first quarter, the Patriots were able to put up a 10–0 lead in the second, going into halftime. In the third quarter, the Pats made it 13–0 by way of Joey Slye's 35-yard field goal. The Bengals finally got on the board when Zack Moss ran for a 5-yard touchdown to make it 13–7. Slye would put the Pats up 16–7 by way of a 37-yard field goal. The Bengals would end the scoring when Evan McPherson kicked a 51-yard field goal to make the final score 16–10.

With the loss, the Bengals started 0–1 for the third consecutive year.

==== Week 2: at Kansas City Chiefs ====
Week 2: Cincinnati Bengals at Kansas City Chiefs – Game summary

Quarter	1	2	3	4	Total
Bengals	3	13	6	3	**25**
**Chiefs**	3	7	7	9	**26**

at Arrowhead Stadium, Kansas City, Missouri

- Date: September 15
- Game time: 4:25 p.m. EDT/3:25 p.m. CDT
- Game weather: 89 °F (32 °C)
- Game attendance: 73,558
- Referee: Alex Kemp
- TV announcers (CBS): Jim Nantz, Tony Romo and Tracy Wolfson
- Recap, Game Book

Game information

**First quarter**

- CIN – Evan McPherson 22-yard field goal, 10:41. Bengals 3–0. **Drive: 10 plays, 66 yards, 4:19.**
- KC – Harrison Butker 19-yard field goal, 2:11. Tied 3–3. **Drive: 16 plays, 69 yards, 8:30.**

**Second quarter**

- CIN – Andrei Iosivas 4-yard pass from Joe Burrow (Evan McPherson kick), 12:04. Bengals 10–3. **Drive: 7 plays, 31 yards, 3:15.**
- KC – Rashee Rice 44-yard pass from Patrick Mahomes (Harrison Butker kick), 8:50. Tied 10–10. **Drive: 6 plays, 70 yards, 3:14.**
- CIN – Evan McPherson 33-yard field goal, 4:19. Bengals 13–10. **Drive: 9 plays, 55 yards, 4:31.**
- CIN – Evan McPherson 48-yard field goal, 1:33. Bengals 16–10. **Drive: 6 plays, 16 yards, 1:28.**

**Third quarter**

- KC – Wanya Morris 1-yard pass from Patrick Mahomes (Harrison Butker kick), 8:21. Chiefs 17–16. **Drive: 13 plays, 70 yards, 6:39.**
- CIN – Andrei Iosivas 3-yard pass from Joe Burrow (kick failed, wide right), 2:16. Bengals 22–17. **Drive: 11 plays, 70 yards, 6:05.**

**Fourth quarter**

- KC – Chamarri Conner 38-yard fumble return (pass failed), 14:40. Chiefs 23–22. **Drive: 3 plays, 0 yards, 0:20.**
- CIN – Evan McPherson 53-yard field goal, 9:28. Bengals 25–23. **Drive: 8 plays, 33 yards, 5:12.**
- KC – Harrison Butker 51-yard field goal, 0:00. Chiefs 26–25. **Drive: 9 plays, 43 yards, 2:35.**

**Top passers**

- CIN – Joe Burrow – 23/36, 258 yards, 2 TD
- KC – Patrick Mahomes – 18/25, 151 yards, 2 TD, 2 INT

**Top rushers**

- CIN – Zack Moss – 12 rushes, 34 yards
- KC – Isiah Pacheco – 19 rushes, 90 yards

**Top receivers**

- CIN – Mike Gesicki – 7 receptions, 91 yards
- KC – Rashee Rice – 5 receptions, 75 yards, TD

After a tough loss at home, the Bengals then traveled to Kansas City to take on the Chiefs. In the first quarter, the Bengals scored first when Evan McPherson kicked a 22-yard field goal to make it 3–0. The Chiefs then made it 3–3 when Harrison Butker kicked a 19-yard field goal. In the second quarter, the Bengals took the lead when Joe Burrow found Andrei Iosivas on a 5-yard touchdown pass to make it 10–3. The Chiefs tied it up at 10–10 when Patrick Mahomes connected with Rashee Rice on a 44-yard touchdown pass. The Bengals then made it 16–10 at halftime by way of a couple field goals by McPherson from 33 and 48 yards out. In the third quarter, the Chiefs retook the lead when Mahomes found Wanya Morris on a 1-yard touchdown pass to make it 17–16. The Bengals took the lead back later on in the quarter when Burrow and Iosivas connected again on a 3-yard touchdown pass (with a failed two-point conversion) to make it 22–17. In the fourth quarter, The Chiefs moved ahead 23–22 when Chamarri Conner returned a fumble 38 yards for a touchdown. The Bengals moved back into the lead when McPherson kicked a 52-yard field goal. Finally, the Chiefs completed the comeback when Butker kicked a 51-yard field goal to make the final score 26–25.

With the loss, the Bengals fell to 0–2 for the third consecutive year.

==== Week 3: vs. Washington Commanders ====
Week 3: Washington Commanders at Cincinnati Bengals – Game summary

Quarter	1	2	3	4	Total
**Commanders**	7	14	7	10	**38**
Bengals	7	6	7	13	**33**

at Paycor Stadium, Cincinnati, Ohio

- Date: September 23
- Game time: 8:15 p.m. EDT
- Game weather: Cloudy, 69 °F (21 °C)
- Game attendance: 66,207
- Referee: Brad Allen
- TV announcers (ABC): Joe Buck, Troy Aikman and Lisa Salters
- Recap, Game Book

Game information

**First quarter**

- CIN – Ja'Marr Chase 41-yard pass from Joe Burrow (Evan McPherson kick), 11:37. Bengals 7–0. **Drive: 6 plays, 71 yards, 3:23.**
- WAS – Brian Robinson Jr. 1-yard run (Austin Seibert kick), 5:25. Tied 7–7. **Drive: 10 plays, 70 yards, 6:12.**

**Second quarter**

- WAS – Austin Ekeler 24-yard run (Austin Seibert kick), 11:31. Commanders 14–7. **Drive: 7 plays, 62 yards, 3:20.**
- CIN – Evan McPherson 28-yard field goal, 5:25. Commanders 14–10. **Drive: 11 plays, 61 yards, 6:06.**
- WAS – Jayden Daniels 4-yard run (Austin Seibert kick), 2:04. Commanders 21–10. **Drive: 6 plays, 75 yards, 3:21.**
- CIN – Evan McPherson 31-yard field goal, 0:22. Commanders 21–13. **Drive: 9 plays, 57 yards, 1:42.**

**Third quarter**

- WAS – Trent Scott 1-yard pass from Jayden Daniels (Austin Seibert kick), 9:54. Commanders 28–13. **Drive: 9 plays, 33 yards, 5:06.**
- CIN – Andrei Iosivas 2-yard pass from Joe Burrow (Evan McPherson kick), 3:03. Commanders 28–20. **Drive: 13 plays, 78 yards, 6:51.**

**Fourth quarter**

- WAS – Austin Seibert 42-yard field goal, 11:30. Commanders 31–20. **Drive: 12 plays, 46 yards, 6:33.**
- CIN – Ja'Marr Chase 31-yard pass from Joe Burrow (pass failed), 9:42. Commanders 31–26. **Drive: 5 plays, 70 yards, 1:48.**
- WAS – Terry McLaurin 27-yard pass from Jayden Daniels (Austin Seibert kick), 2:10. Commanders 38–26. **Drive: 12 plays, 70 yards, 7:32.**
- CIN – Zack Moss 1-yard run (Evan McPherson kick), 0:40. Commanders 38–33. **Drive: 8 plays, 70 yards, 1:30.**

**Top passers**

- WAS – Jayden Daniels – 21/23, 254 yards, 2 TD
- CIN – Joe Burrow – 29/38, 324 yards, 3 TD

**Top rushers**

- WAS – Jayden Daniels – 12 rushes, 39 yards, TD
- CIN – Chase Brown – 7 rushes, 62 yards

**Top receivers**

- WAS – Terry McLaurin – 4 receptions, 100 yards, TD
- CIN – Ja'Marr Chase – 6 receptions, 118 yards, 2 TD

Despite the loss, which dropped Cincinnati to 0–3 for the first time since 2019, this game became the sixth regular season "no punt game" in recorded NFL history. In particular, both Washington and Cincinnati finished the game without a punt or a turnover, the first time this has occurred since at least 1940, when NFL stats began to be regularly recorded.

==== Week 4: at Carolina Panthers ====
Week 4: Cincinnati Bengals at Carolina Panthers – Game summary

Quarter	1	2	3	4	Total
**Bengals**	7	14	10	3	**34**
Panthers	0	14	7	3	**24**

at Bank of America Stadium, Charlotte, North Carolina

- Date: September 29
- Game time: 1:00 p.m. EDT
- Game weather: Mostly cloudy, 78 °F (26 °C)
- Game attendance: 72,258
- Referee: Adrian Hill
- TV announcers (Fox): Kevin Kugler, Daryl Johnston, and Laura Okmin
- Recap, Game Book

Game information

**First quarter**

- CIN – Chase Brown 3-yard run (Evan McPherson kick), 0:05. Bengals 7–0. **Drive: 5 plays, 16 yards, 2:04.**

**Second quarter**

- CAR – Chuba Hubbard 3-yard run (Eddy Piñeiro kick), 9:31. Tied 7–7. **Drive: 11 plays, 70 yards, 5:34.**
- CIN – Ja'Marr Chase 63-yard pass from Joe Burrow (Evan McPherson kick), 7:14. Bengals 14–7. **Drive: 4 plays, 81 yards, 2:17.**
- CAR – Xavier Legette 8-yard pass from Andy Dalton (Eddy Piñeiro kick), 1:09. Tied 14–14. **Drive: 11 plays, 70 yards, 6:05.**
- CIN – Zack Moss 1-yard pass from Joe Burrow (Evan McPherson kick), 0:01. Bengals 21–14. **Drive: 8 plays, 66 yards, 1:08.**

**Third quarter**

- CIN – Chase Brown 1-yard run (Evan McPherson kick), 10:38. Bengals 28–14. **Drive: 8 plays, 71 yards, 4:22.**
- CIN – Evan McPherson 56-yard field goal, 2:52. Bengals 31–14. **Drive: 5 plays, -3 yards, 2:26.**
- CAR – Diontae Johnson 21-yard pass from Andy Dalton (Eddy Piñeiro kick), 0:53. Bengals 31–21. **Drive: 5 plays, 70 yards, 1:59.**

**Fourth quarter**

- CAR – Eddy Piñeiro 48-yard field goal, 7:42. Bengals 31–24. **Drive: 8 plays, 29 yards, 3:46.**
- CIN – Evan McPherson 46-yard field goal, 1:14. Bengals 34–24. **Drive: 9 plays, 35 yards, 3:09.**

**Top passers**

- CIN – Joe Burrow – 22/31, 232 yards, 2 TD, INT
- CAR – Andy Dalton – 25/40, 220 yards, 2 TD, INT

**Top rushers**

- CIN – Chase Brown – 15 rushes, 80 yards, 2 TD
- CAR – Chuba Hubbard – 18 rushes, 104 yards, TD

**Top receivers**

- CIN – Ja'Marr Chase – 3 receptions, 85 yards, TD
- CAR – Diontae Johnson – 7 receptions, 83 yards, TD

The Bengals defeated the Panthers and their former quarterback, Andy Dalton, who was filling in for an injured Bryce Young. This was the first time the Bengals had defeated the Panthers in Charlotte since 2010. The Bengals moved to 1–3.

==== Week 5: vs. Baltimore Ravens ====
Week 5: Baltimore Ravens at Cincinnati Bengals – Game summary

Quarter	1	2	3	4	OT	Total
**Ravens**	7	7	7	17	3	**41**
Bengals	0	17	7	14	0	**38**

at Paycor Stadium, Cincinnati, Ohio

- Date: October 6
- Game time: 1:00 p.m. EDT
- Game weather: Mostly sunny, 81 °F (27 °C)
- Game attendance: 66,341
- Referee: Bill Vinovich
- TV announcers (CBS): Kevin Harlan, Trent Green and Melanie Collins
- Recap, Game Book

Game information

**First quarter**

- BAL – Derrick Henry 1-yard run (Justin Tucker kick), 8:54. Ravens 7–0. **Drive: 12 plays, 70 yards, 6:06.**

**Second quarter**

- CIN – Tee Higgins 11-yard pass from Joe Burrow (Evan McPherson kick), 13:44. Tied 7–7. **Drive: 10 plays, 86 yards, 4:45.**
- BAL – Rashod Bateman 16-yard pass from Lamar Jackson (Justin Tucker kick), 8:09. Ravens 14–7. **Drive: 7 plays, 51 yards, 2:59.**
- CIN – Sam Hubbard safety, 5:47. Ravens 14–9.
- CIN – Ja'Marr Chase 41-yard pass from Joe Burrow (Chase Brown run), 0:09. Bengals 17–14. **Drive: 4 plays, 79 yards, 0:25.**

**Third quarter**

- CIN – Tee Higgins 5-yard pass from Joe Burrow (Evan McPherson kick), 8:51. Bengals 24–14. **Drive: 12 plays, 70 yards, 6:09.**
- BAL – Isaiah Likely 1-yard pass from Lamar Jackson (Justin Tucker kick), 6:38. Bengals 24–21. **Drive: 4 plays, 74 yards, 2:13.**

**Fourth quarter**

- CIN – Chase Brown 4-yard pass from Joe Burrow (Evan McPherson kick), 14:19. Bengals 31–21. **Drive: 12 plays, 70 yards, 7:19.**
- BAL – Charlie Kolar 2-yard pass from Lamar Jackson (Justin Tucker kick), 9:05. Bengals 31–28. **Drive: 10 plays, 92 yards, 5:14.**
- CIN – Ja'Marr Chase 70-yard pass from Joe Burrow (Evan McPherson kick), 8:54. Bengals 38–28. **Drive: 1 play, 70 yards, 0:11.**
- BAL – Isaiah Likely 6-yard pass from Lamar Jackson (Justin Tucker kick), 5:24. Bengals 38–35. **Drive: 11 plays, 70 yards, 3:30.**
- BAL – Justin Tucker 56-yard field goal, 1:35. Tied 38–38. **Drive: 8 plays, 34 yards, 1:26.**

**Overtime**

- BAL – Justin Tucker 24-yard field goal, 3:33. Ravens 41–38. **Drive: 2 plays, 51 yards, 0:53.**

**Top passers**

- BAL – Lamar Jackson – 26/42, 348 yards, 4 TD
- CIN – Joe Burrow – 30/39, 392 yards, 5 TD, INT

**Top rushers**

- BAL – Derrick Henry – 15 rushes, 92 yards, TD
- CIN – Chase Brown – 12 rushes, 46 yards

**Top receivers**

- BAL – Zay Flowers – 7 receptions, 111 yards
- CIN – Ja'Marr Chase – 10 receptions, 193 yards, 2 TD

Despite a career day for Joe Burrow, the Bengals could not contain Lamar Jackson and the Ravens offense, choking away leads of 31-21 and 38-28 and falling in overtime to fall to 1–4 on the season.

==== Week 6: at New York Giants ====
Week 6: Cincinnati Bengals at New York Giants – Game summary

Quarter	1	2	3	4	Total
**Bengals**	7	0	3	7	**17**
Giants	0	0	7	0	**7**

at MetLife Stadium, East Rutherford, New Jersey

- Date: October 13
- Game time: 8:20 p.m. EDT
- Game weather: Fair, 63 °F (17 °C)
- Game attendance: 78,809
- Referee: Carl Cheffers
- TV announcers (NBC): Mike Tirico, Cris Collinsworth and Melissa Stark
- Recap, Game Book

Game information

**First quarter**

- CIN – Joe Burrow 47-yard run (Evan McPherson kick), 11:32. Bengals 7–0. **Drive: 8 plays, 69 yards, 3:28.**

**Second quarter**

- No scoring plays.

**Third quarter**

- NYG – Tyrone Tracy Jr. 1-yard run (Greg Joseph kick), 5:48. Tied 7–7. **Drive: 16 plays, 79 yards, 6:45.**
- CIN – Evan McPherson 37-yard field goal, 0:41. Bengals 10–7. **Drive: 9 plays, 51 yards, 5:07.**

**Fourth quarter**

- CIN – Chase Brown 30-yard run (Evan McPherson kick), 1:52. Bengals 17–7. **Drive: 5 plays, 64 yards, 1:09.**

**Top passers**

- CIN – Joe Burrow – 19/28, 208 yards
- NYG – Daniel Jones – 22/41, 205 yards, INT

**Top rushers**

- CIN – Joe Burrow – 4 rushes, 55 yards, TD
- NYG – Daniel Jones – 11 rushes, 56 yards

**Top receivers**

- CIN – Tee Higgins – 7 receptions, 77 yards
- NYG – Darius Slayton – 6 receptions, 57 yards

The Bengals recorded their first road win against the Giants, having not done so in 4 other attempts.

==== Week 7: at Cleveland Browns ====
Week 7: Cincinnati Bengals at Cleveland Browns – Game summary

Quarter	1	2	3	4	Total
**Bengals**	7	0	14	0	**21**
Browns	0	6	0	8	**14**

at Huntington Bank Field, Cleveland, Ohio

- Date: October 20
- Game time: 1:00 p.m. EDT
- Game weather: Sunny, 62 °F (17 °C)
- Game attendance: 68,143
- Referee: Ronald Torbert
- TV announcers (CBS): Spero Dedes, Adam Archuleta and Aditi Kinkhabwala
- Recap, Game Book

Game information

**First quarter**

- CIN – Charlie Jones 100-yard kickoff return (Evan McPherson kick), 14:48. Bengals 7–0.

**Second quarter**

- CLE – Nick Chubb 1-yard run (kick failed, wide left), 0:56. Bengals 7–6. **Drive: 12 plays, 78 yards, 4:29.**

**Third quarter**

- CIN – Ja'Marr Chase 18-yard pass from Joe Burrow (Evan McPherson kick), 7:56. Bengals 14–6. **Drive: 5 plays, 65 yards, 2:53.**
- CIN – Tee Higgins 25-yard pass from Joe Burrow (Evan McPherson kick), 1:30. Bengals 21–6. **Drive: 4 plays, 50 yards, 1:55.**

**Fourth quarter**

- CLE – David Njoku 8-yard pass from Jameis Winston (Jameis Winston–Cedric Tillman pass), 1:27. Bengals 21–14. **Drive: 12 plays, 60 yards, 2:16.**

**Top passers**

- CIN – Joe Burrow – 15/25, 181 yards, TD
- CLE – Deshaun Watson – 15/17, 128 yards

**Top rushers**

- CIN – Chase Brown – 15 rushes, 44 yards
- CLE – Dorian Thompson-Robinson – 3 rushes, 44 yards

**Top receivers**

- CIN – Tee Higgins – 4 receptions, 82 yards, TD
- CLE – Cedric Tillman – 8 receptions, 81 yards

This was Joe Burrow's first win in Cleveland and the Bengals first win in Cleveland since 2017.

==== Week 8: vs. Philadelphia Eagles ====
Week 8: Philadelphia Eagles at Cincinnati Bengals – Game summary

Quarter	1	2	3	4	Total
**Eagles**	0	10	14	13	**37**
Bengals	7	3	7	0	**17**

at Paycor Stadium, Cincinnati, Ohio

- Date: October 27
- Game time: 1:00 p.m. EDT
- Game weather: Sunny, 59 °F (15 °C)
- Game attendance: 67,239
- Referee: Scott Novak (Note: John Hussey was originally assigned as the referee for this game. However, due to an unknown injury, Hussey was replaced by Scott Novak.)
- TV announcers (CBS): Ian Eagle, Charles Davis and Evan Washburn
- Recap, Game Book

Game information

**First quarter**

- CIN – Ja'Marr Chase 2-yard pass from Joe Burrow (Evan McPherson kick), 4:56. Bengals 7–0. **Drive: 17 plays, 70 yards, 10:04.**

**Second quarter**

- PHI – Jake Elliott 39-yard field goal, 14:10. Bengals 7–3. **Drive: 10 plays, 52 yards, 5:46.**
- CIN – Evan McPherson 27-yard field goal, 9:32. Bengals 10–3. **Drive: 11 plays, 61 yards, 4:38.**
- PHI – Jalen Hurts 1-yard run (Jake Elliott kick), 0:22. Tied 10–10. **Drive: 12 plays, 56 yards, 4:46.**

**Third quarter**

- PHI – Jalen Hurts 7-yard run (Jake Elliott kick), 10:35. Eagles 17–10. **Drive: 8 plays, 70 yards, 4:25.**
- CIN – Chase Brown 4-yard run (Evan McPherson kick), 4:16. Tied 17–17. **Drive: 13 plays, 70 yards, 6:19.**
- PHI – DeVonta Smith 45-yard pass from Jalen Hurts (Jake Elliott kick), 2:43. Eagles 24–17. **Drive: 3 plays, 70 yards, 1:33.**

**Fourth quarter**

- PHI – Jake Elliott 49-yard field goal, 13:34. Eagles 27–17. **Drive: 4 plays, 6 yards, 2:07.**
- PHI – Jalen Hurts 1-yard run (Jake Elliott kick), 4:39. Eagles 34–17. **Drive: 12 plays, 85 yards, 7:37.**
- PHI – Jake Elliott 47-yard field goal, 1:55. Eagles 37–17. **Drive: 6 plays, 3 yards, 2:36.**

**Top passers**

- PHI – Jalen Hurts – 16/20, 236 yards, TD
- CIN – Joe Burrow – 26/37, 234 yards, TD, INT

**Top rushers**

- PHI – Saquon Barkley – 22 rushes, 108 yards
- CIN – Chase Brown – 12 rushes, 32 yards, TD

**Top receivers**

- PHI – DeVonta Smith – 6 receptions, 85 yards, TD
- CIN – Mike Gesicki – 7 receptions, 73 yards

The Bengals returned home to take on the Philadelphia Eagles. Despite taking an early 10–3 lead, the Bengals could not slow down the visiting Eagles as they would be outscored 34–7 by Philadelphia the rest of the way. Cincinnati fell to 0–4 at home on the season with the 37–17 blowout loss, their only multiple-score loss of the 2024 season. This was the Bengals' first loss to the Eagles since the 2000 season, and their first ever home loss to Philadelphia.

The game traded time slots with the Chicago Bears-Washington Commanders matchup. As such, this was no longer the marquee Sunday matchup of the day.

==== Week 9: vs. Las Vegas Raiders ====
Week 9: Las Vegas Raiders at Cincinnati Bengals – Game summary

Quarter	1	2	3	4	Total
Raiders	7	3	0	14	**24**
**Bengals**	7	10	14	10	**41**

at Paycor Stadium, Cincinnati, Ohio

- Date: November 3
- Game time: 1:00 p.m. EST
- Game weather: Sunny, 67 °F (19 °C)
- Game attendance: 65,962
- Referee: Brad Rogers
- TV announcers (Fox): Kevin Kugler, Daryl Johnston and Laura Okmin
- Recap, Game Book

Game information

**First quarter**

- LV – Zamir White 1-yard run (Daniel Carlson kick), 9:36. Raiders 7–0. **Drive: 11 plays, 70 yards, 5:24.**
- CIN – Chase Brown 1-yard pass from Joe Burrow (Evan McPherson kick), 1:39. Tied 7–7. **Drive: 13 plays, 70 yards, 7:57.**

**Second quarter**

- CIN – Evan McPherson 44-yard field goal, 7:00. Bengals 10–7. **Drive: 14 plays, 64 yards, 6:29.**
- LV – Daniel Carlson 46-yard field goal, 2:58. Tied 10–10. **Drive: 7 plays, 42 yards, 4:02.**
- CIN – Andrei Iosivas 10-yard pass from Joe Burrow (Evan McPherson kick), 0:32. Bengals 17–10. **Drive: 5 plays, 70 yards, 2:26.**

**Third quarter**

- CIN – Drew Sample 2-yard pass from Joe Burrow (Evan McPherson kick), 11:27. Bengals 24–10. **Drive: 7 plays, 70 yards, 3:33.**
- CIN – Mike Gesicki 11-yard pass from Joe Burrow (Evan McPherson kick), 7:34. Bengals 31–10. **Drive: 5 plays, 21 yards, 2:08.**

**Fourth quarter**

- LV – Jack Jones 29-yard interception return (Daniel Carlson kick), 13:17. Bengals 31–17.
- CIN – Mike Gesicki 47-yard pass from Joe Burrow (Evan McPherson kick), 5:37. Bengals 38–17. **Drive: 6 plays, 64 yards, 0:59.**
- CIN – Evan McPherson 27-yard field goal, 1:53. Bengals 41–17. **Drive: 7 plays, 4 yards, 3:36.**
- LV – Brock Bowers 22-yard pass from Desmond Ridder (Daniel Carlson kick), 0:41. Bengals 41–24. **Drive: 6 plays, 70 yards, 1:12.**

**Top passers**

- LV – Gardner Minshew – 10/17, 124 yards
- CIN – Joe Burrow – 27/39, 251 yards, 5 TD, INT

**Top rushers**

- LV – Alexander Mattison – 9 rushes, 36 yards
- CIN – Chase Brown – 27 rushes, 120 yards

**Top receivers**

- LV – Jakobi Meyers – 8 receptions, 105 yards
- CIN – Mike Gesicki – 5 receptions, 100 yards, 2 TD

The Bengals defeated the Raiders in their meeting against them since their playoff meeting 3 years earlier, in which the Bengals ended their playoff drought.

==== Week 10: at Baltimore Ravens ====
Week 10: Cincinnati Bengals at Baltimore Ravens – Game summary

Quarter	1	2	3	4	Total
Bengals	7	7	7	13	**34**
**Ravens**	0	7	7	21	**35**

at M&T Bank Stadium, Baltimore, Maryland

- Date: November 7
- Game time: 8:15 p.m. EST
- Game weather: Clear, 69 °F (21 °C)
- Game attendance: 71,439
- Referee: Clete Blakeman
- TV announcers (WCPO/Prime Video): Al Michaels, Kirk Herbstreit and Kaylee Hartung
  Game exclusive to WCPO through syndication. Out of market on Prime Video.
- Recap, Game Book

Game information

**First quarter**

- CIN – Chase Brown 1-yard run (Evan McPherson kick), 9:23. Bengals 7–0. **Drive: 12 plays, 70 yards, 5:37.**

**Second quarter**

- BAL – Nelson Agholor 6-yard pass from Lamar Jackson (Justin Tucker kick), 13:04. Tied 7–7. **Drive: 9 plays, 59 yards, 4:52.**
- CIN – Tanner Hudson 3-yard pass from Joe Burrow (Evan McPherson kick), 0:30. Bengals 14–7. **Drive: 10 plays, 73 yards, 3:32.**

**Third quarter**

- CIN – Ja'Marr Chase 67-yard pass from Joe Burrow (Evan McPherson kick), 13:09. Bengals 21–7. **Drive: 1 play, 67 yards, 0:12.**
- BAL – Derrick Henry 1-yard run (Justin Tucker kick), 4:12. Bengals 21–14. **Drive: 5 plays, 31 yards, 2:46.**

**Fourth quarter**

- BAL – Tylan Wallace 84-yard pass from Lamar Jackson (kick failed, wide left), 13:30. Bengals 21–20. **Drive: 3 plays, 92 yards, 1:14.**
- BAL – Mark Andrews 18-yard pass from Lamar Jackson (Lamar Jackson run), 5:50. Ravens 28–21. **Drive: 7 plays, 65 yards, 3:34.**
- CIN – Ja'Marr Chase 70-yard pass from Joe Burrow (Evan McPherson kick), 5:37. Tied 28–28. **Drive: 1 play, 70 yards, 0:13.**
- BAL – Rashod Bateman 5-yard pass from Lamar Jackson (Justin Tucker kick), 1:49. Ravens 35–28. **Drive: 11 plays, 70 yards, 3:48.**
- CIN – Ja'Marr Chase 5-yard pass from Joe Burrow (pass failed), 0:38. Ravens 35–34. **Drive: 9 plays, 70 yards, 1:11.**

**Top passers**

- CIN – Joe Burrow – 34/56, 428 yards, 4 TD
- BAL – Lamar Jackson – 25/33, 290 yards, 4 TD

**Top rushers**

- CIN – Chase Brown – 13 rushes, 42 yards, TD
- BAL – Derrick Henry – 16 rushes, 68 yards, TD

**Top receivers**

- CIN – Ja'Marr Chase – 11 receptions, 264 yards, 3 TD
- BAL – Tylan Wallace – 3 receptions, 115 yards, TD

For the second time this season, a career day by Joe Burrow against Baltimore was wasted by the heroics of Lamar Jackson.

==== Week 11: at Los Angeles Chargers ====
Week 11: Cincinnati Bengals at Los Angeles Chargers – Game summary

Quarter	1	2	3	4	Total
Bengals	3	3	14	7	**27**
**Chargers**	7	17	3	7	**34**

at SoFi Stadium, Inglewood, California

- Date: November 17
- Game time: 8:20 p.m. EST/5:20 p.m. PST
- Game weather: Clear, 61 °F (16 °C) (fixed roof)
- Game attendance: 70,240
- Referee: Brad Allen
- TV announcers (NBC): Mike Tirico, Cris Collinsworth and Melissa Stark
- Recap, Game Book

Game information

**First quarter**

- CIN – Evan McPherson 26-yard field goal, 6:27. Bengals 3–0. **Drive: 9 plays, 56 yards, 3:50.**
- LAC – Will Dissly 29-yard pass from Justin Herbert (Cameron Dicker kick), 3:34. Chargers 7–3. **Drive: 5 plays, 70 yards, 2:53.**

**Second quarter**

- CIN – Evan McPherson 27-yard field goal, 12:54. Chargers 7–6. **Drive: 11 plays, 57 yards, 5:40.**
- LAC – Quentin Johnston 26-yard pass from Justin Herbert (Cameron Dicker kick), 11:02. Chargers 14–6. **Drive: 4 plays, 71 yards, 1:52.**
- LAC – J. K. Dobbins 1-yard run (Cameron Dicker kick), 0:00. Chargers 21–6. **Drive: 9 plays, 66 yards, 4:53.**
- LAC – Cameron Dicker 19-yard field goal, 0:00. Chargers 24–6. **Drive: 11 plays, 78 yards, 2:33.**

**Third quarter**

- LAC – Cameron Dicker 53-yard field goal, 10:29. Chargers 27–6. **Drive: 7 plays, 24 yards, 2:54.**
- CIN – Ja'Marr Chase 4-yard pass from Joe Burrow (Evan McPherson kick), 5:27. Chargers 27–13. **Drive: 11 plays, 70 yards, 5:02.**
- CIN – Tee Higgins 42-yard pass from Joe Burrow (Evan McPherson kick), 2:53. Chargers 27–20. **Drive: 4 plays, 50 yards, 1:34.**

**Fourth quarter**

- CIN – Ja'Marr Chase 17-yard pass from Joe Burrow (Evan McPherson kick), 12:21. Tied 27–27. **Drive: 7 plays, 71 yards, 2:29.**
- LAC – J. K. Dobbins 29-yard run (Cameron Dicker kick), 0:18. Chargers 34–27. **Drive: 4 plays, 84 yards, 0:27.**

**Top passers**

- CIN – Joe Burrow – 28/50, 356 yards, 3 TD
- LAC – Justin Herbert – 17/36, 297 yards, 2 TD

**Top rushers**

- CIN – Chase Brown – 22 rushes, 86 yards
- LAC – Justin Herbert – 5 rushes, 65 yards

**Top receivers**

- CIN – Tee Higgins – 9 receptions, 148 yards, TD
- LAC – Ladd McConkey – 6 receptions, 123 yards

Although they tied the game at 27 after trailing 27-6, Evan McPherson missed 2 field goals late, and this ultimately led to the Chargers scoring a late touchdown to seal the win for them. The Bengals fell to 4–7.

==== Week 13: vs. Pittsburgh Steelers ====
Week 13: Pittsburgh Steelers at Cincinnati Bengals – Game summary

Quarter	1	2	3	4	Total
**Steelers**	7	20	7	10	**44**
Bengals	14	7	3	14	**38**

at Paycor Stadium, Cincinnati, Ohio

- Date: December 1
- Game time: 1:00 p.m. EST
- Game weather: Partly cloudy, 32 °F (0 °C)
- Game attendance: 66,112
- Referee: Shawn Hochuli
- TV announcers (CBS): Ian Eagle, Charles Davis and Evan Washburn
- Recap, Game Book

Game information

**First quarter**

- CIN – Cam Taylor-Britt 51-yard interception return (Evan McPherson kick), 11:49. Bengals 7–0.
- PIT – George Pickens 17-yard pass from Russell Wilson (Chris Boswell kick), 7:41. Tied 7–7. **Drive: 7 plays, 70 yards, 4:08.**
- CIN – Chase Brown 1-yard run (Evan McPherson kick), 5:01. Bengals 14–7. **Drive: 6 plays, 75 yards, 2:40.**

**Second quarter**

- PIT – Calvin Austin 23-yard pass from Russell Wilson (Chris Boswell kick), 14:56. Tied 14–14. **Drive: 10 plays, 70 yards, 5:05.**
- CIN – Ja'Marr Chase 4-yard pass from Joe Burrow (Evan McPherson kick), 9:52. Bengals 21–14. **Drive: 9 plays, 70 yards, 5:04.**
- PIT – Najee Harris 10-yard run (Chris Boswell kick), 7:19. Tied 21–21. **Drive: 5 plays, 68 yards, 2:33.**
- PIT – Chris Boswell 50-yard field goal, 3:31. Steelers 24–21. **Drive: 5 plays, 29 yards, 1:05.**
- PIT – Chris Boswell 34-yard field goal, 0:00. Steelers 27–21. **Drive: 8 plays, 65 yards, 1:56.**

**Third quarter**

- CIN – Evan McPherson 38-yard field goal, 3:53. Steelers 27–24. **Drive: 12 plays, 48 yards, 7:35.**
- PIT – Pat Freiermuth 25-yard pass from Russell Wilson (Chris Boswell kick), 0:22. Steelers 34–24. **Drive: 6 plays, 80 yards, 3:31.**

**Fourth quarter**

- PIT – Payton Wilson 21-yard fumble return (Chris Boswell kick), 11:06. 11:06. **Steelers 41–24.**
- CIN – Tee Higgins 1-yard pass from Joe Burrow (Evan McPherson kick), 8:39. Steelers 41–31. **Drive: 7 plays, 70 yards, 2:27.**
- PIT – Chris Boswell 30-yard field goal, 3:53. Steelers 44–31. **Drive: 11 plays, 72 yards, 4:46.**
- CIN – Andrei Iosivas 3-yard pass from Joe Burrow (Evan McPherson kick), 2:39. Steelers 44–38. **Drive: 5 plays, 64 yards, 1:14.**

**Top passers**

- PIT – Russell Wilson – 29/38, 414 yards, 3 TD, INT
- CIN – Joe Burrow – 28/38, 309 yards, 3 TD, INT

**Top rushers**

- PIT – Najee Harris – 16 rushes, 75 yards, TD
- CIN – Chase Brown – 12 rushes, 70 yards, TD

**Top receivers**

- PIT – George Pickens – 3 receptions, 74 yards, TD
- CIN – Ja'Marr Chase – 6 receptions, 86 yards, TD

The Bengals became the first team in NFL history to lose 3 games where they scored 30 or more points in one season.

==== Week 14: at Dallas Cowboys ====
Week 14: Cincinnati Bengals at Dallas Cowboys – Game summary

Quarter	1	2	3	4	Total
**Bengals**	7	10	0	10	**27**
Cowboys	7	3	7	3	**20**

at AT&T Stadium, Arlington, Texas

- Date: December 9
- Game time: 8:15 p.m. EST/7:15 p.m. CST
- Game weather: Clear, 59 °F (15 °C) (retractable roof open)
- Game attendance: 92,587
- Referee: Scott Novak
- TV announcers (ESPN/ABC): Joe Buck, Troy Aikman and Lisa Salters
- Recap, Game Book

Game information

**First quarter**

- DAL – CeeDee Lamb 11-yard pass from Cooper Rush (Brandon Aubrey kick), 8:55. Cowboys 7–0. **Drive: 9 plays, 60 yards, 4:29.**
- CIN – Ja'Marr Chase 5-yard pass from Joe Burrow (Cade York kick), 2:45. Tied 7–7. **Drive: 11 plays, 70 yards, 6:10.**

**Second quarter**

- DAL – Brandon Aubrey 35-yard field goal, 6:23. Cowboys 10–7. **Drive: 7 plays, 39 yards, 3:28.**
- CIN – Chase Brown 19-yard pass from Joe Burrow (Cade York kick), 3:35. Bengals 14–10. **Drive: 6 plays, 64 yards, 2:53.**
- CIN – Cade York 37-yard field goal, 0:30. Bengals 17–10. **Drive: 7 plays, 36 yards, 1:20.**

**Third quarter**

- DAL – Brandin Cooks 3-yard pass from Cooper Rush (Brandon Aubrey kick), 10:32. Tied 17–17. **Drive: 8 plays, 70 yards, 4:28.**

**Fourth quarter**

- DAL – Brandon Aubrey 47-yard field goal, 14:55. Cowboys 20–17. **Drive: 13 plays, 54 yards, 6:55.**
- CIN – Cade York 29-yard field goal, 10:24. Tied 20–20. **Drive: 9 plays, 58 yards, 4:31.**
- CIN – Ja'Marr Chase 40-yard pass from Joe Burrow (Cade York kick), 1:01. Bengals 27–20. **Drive: 3 plays, 57 yards, 0:52.**

**Top passers**

- CIN – Joe Burrow – 33/44, 369 yards, 3 TD, INT
- DAL – Cooper Rush – 16/31, 183 yards, 2 TD, INT

**Top rushers**

- CIN – Chase Brown – 14 rushes, 58 yards
- DAL – Rico Dowdle – 18 rushes, 131 yards

**Top receivers**

- CIN – Ja'Marr Chase – 14 receptions, 177 yards, 2 TD
- DAL – CeeDee Lamb – 6 receptions, 93 yards, TD

This was Cincinnati's first win in Dallas and against the Cowboys since 1988 and 2004 respectively.

==== Week 15: at Tennessee Titans ====
Week 15: Cincinnati Bengals at Tennessee Titans – Game summary

Quarter	1	2	3	4	Total
**Bengals**	7	17	7	6	**37**
Titans	14	0	0	13	**27**

at Nissan Stadium, Nashville, Tennessee

- Date: December 15
- Game time: 1:00 p.m. EST/12:00 p.m. CST
- Game weather: Cloudy, 52 °F (11 °C)
- Game attendance: 63,745
- Referee: Craig Wrolstad
- TV announcers (Fox): Kevin Kugler, Daryl Johnston and Laura Okmin
- Recap, Game Book

Game information

**First quarter**

- TEN – Tony Pollard 3-yard run (Nick Folk kick), 10:52. Titans 7–0. **Drive: 6 plays, 29 yards, 3:23.**
- CIN – Chase Brown 6-yard pass from Joe Burrow (Cade York kick), 6:36. Tied 7–7. **Drive: 9 plays, 70 yards, 4:16.**
- TEN – Tyjae Spears 1-yard run (Nick Folk kick), 3:58. Titans 14–7. **Drive: 5 plays, 70 yards, 2:38.**

**Second quarter**

- CIN – Sam Hubbard 2-yard pass from Joe Burrow (Cade York kick), 5:13. Tied 14–14. **Drive: 9 plays, 62 yards, 4:52.**
- CIN – Tee Higgins 38-yard pass from Joe Burrow (Cade York kick), 1:12. Bengals 21–14. **Drive: 3 plays, 38 yards, 0:47.**
- CIN – Cade York 21-yard field goal, 0:02. Bengals 24–14. **Drive: 11 plays, 35 yards, 1:05.**

**Third quarter**

- CIN – Geno Stone 39-yard interception return for a touchdown (Cade York kick), 7:24. Bengals 31–14.

**Fourth quarter**

- TEN – Tyjae Spears 17-yard pass from Mason Rudolph (Nick Folk kick), 6:50. Bengals 31–21. **Drive: 9 plays, 87 yards, 3:39.**
- CIN – Chase Brown 5-yard run (kick failed, wide left), 1:09. Bengals 37–21. **Drive: 14 plays, 67 yards, 5:41.**
- TEN – Josh Whyle 13-yard pass from Mason Rudolph, 0:00. Bengals 37–27. **Drive: 7 plays, 70 yards, 1:09.**

**Top passers**

- CIN – Joe Burrow – 26/37, 271 yards, 3 TD, 2 INT
- TEN – Mason Rudolph – 21/26, 209 yards, 2 TD, INT

**Top rushers**

- CIN – Chase Brown – 25 rushes, 97 yards, TD
- TEN – Tony Pollard – 17 rushes, 45 yards, TD

**Top receivers**

- CIN – Ja'Marr Chase – 9 receptions, 94 yards
- TEN – Tyjae Spears – 6 receptions, 87 yards, TD

In a turnover-filled game by both teams, the Bengals defeated the Titans 37–27 despite committing 4 turnovers on offense, though they made up for this by forcing 6 Titan turnovers. The Bengals kept their playoff hopes alive by improving to 6–8.

==== Week 16: vs. Cleveland Browns ====
Week 16: Cleveland Browns at Cincinnati Bengals – Game summary

Quarter	1	2	3	4	Total
Browns	0	0	6	0	**6**
**Bengals**	7	10	0	7	**24**

at Paycor Stadium, Cincinnati, Ohio

- Date: December 22
- Game time: 1:00 p.m. EST
- Game weather: Mostly sunny, 33 °F (1 °C)
- Game attendance: 65,734
- Referee: Brad Rogers
- TV announcers (CBS): Spero Dedes, Adam Archuleta and Aditi Kinkhabwala
- Recap, Game Book

Game information

**First quarter**

- CIN – Tee Higgins 2-yard pass from Joe Burrow (Cade York kick), 7:14. Bengals 7–0. **Drive: 8 plays, 99 yards, 4:58.**

**Second quarter**

- CIN – Andrei Iosivas 6-yard pass from Joe Burrow (Cade York kick), 7:32. Bengals 14–0. **Drive: 9 plays, 50 yards, 4:02.**
- CIN – Cade York 59-yard field goal, 0:00. Bengals 17–0. **Drive: 8 plays, 27 yards, 3:51.**

**Third quarter**

- CLE – Jerome Ford 4-yard run (kick failed, wide right), 5:50. Bengals 17–6. **Drive: 11 plays, 70 yards, 5:20.**

**Fourth quarter**

- CIN – Ja'Marr Chase 32-yard pass from Joe Burrow (Cade York kick), 1:44. Bengals 24–6. **Drive: 2 plays, 36 yards, 0:10.**

**Top passers**

- CLE – Dorian Thompson-Robinson – 20/34, 157 yards, 2 INT
- CIN – Joe Burrow – 23/30, 252 yards, 3 TD

**Top rushers**

- CLE – Jerome Ford – 11 rushes, 92 yards, TD
- CIN – Chase Brown – 18 rushes, 91 yards

**Top receivers**

- CLE – David Njoku – 8 receptions, 66 yards
- CIN – Ja'Marr Chase – 6 receptions, 97 yards, TD

With the win, the Bengals improved to 7–8 and remained alive in the playoff race. They also swept Cleveland for the first time since 2017.

==== Week 17: vs. Denver Broncos ====
Week 17: Denver Broncos at Cincinnati Bengals – Game summary

Quarter	1	2	3	4	OT	Total
Broncos	3	0	7	14	0	**24**
**Bengals**	0	7	3	14	6	**30**

at Paycor Stadium, Cincinnati, Ohio

- Date: December 28
- Game time: 4:30 p.m. EST
- Game weather: Cloudy, 60 °F (16 °C)
- Game attendance: 66,546
- Referee: Adrian Hill
- TV announcers (WXIX/NFLN): Kevin Harlan, Trent Green and Melanie Collins
  Game exclusive to WXIX through syndication. Out of market on the NFL Network.
- Recap, Game Book

Game information

**First quarter**

- DEN – Wil Lutz 30-yard field goal, 9:45. Broncos 3–0. **Drive: 10 plays, 58 yards, 5:15.**

**Second quarter**

- CIN – Tee Higgins 2-yard pass from Joe Burrow (Cade York kick), 1:49. Bengals 7–3. **Drive: 7 plays, 62 yards, 3:06.**

**Third quarter**

- CIN – Cade York 22-yard field goal, 9:07. Bengals 10–3. **Drive: 11 plays, 69 yards, 5:53.**
- DEN – Courtland Sutton 6-yard pass from Bo Nix (Wil Lutz kick), 3:10. Tied 10–10. **Drive: 12 plays, 70 yards, 5:57.**

**Fourth quarter**

- CIN – Tee Higgins 12-yard pass from Joe Burrow (Cade York kick), 11:33. Bengals 17–10. **Drive: 11 plays, 63 yards, 6:37.**
- DEN – Marvin Mims 51-yard pass from Bo Nix (Wil Lutz kick), 8:48. Tied 17–17. **Drive: 5 plays, 75 yards, 2:45.**
- CIN – Joe Burrow 1-yard run (Cade York kick), 1:29. Bengals 24–17. **Drive: 6 plays, 59 yards, 1:01.**
- DEN – Marvin Mims 25-yard pass from Bo Nix (Wil Lutz kick), 0:08. Tied 24–24. **Drive: 7 plays, 70 yards, 1:21.**

**Overtime**

- CIN – Tee Higgins 3-yard pass from Joe Burrow, 1:07. Bengals 30–24. **Drive: 5 plays, 63 yards, 1:13.**

**Top passers**

- DEN – Bo Nix – 24/31, 219 yards, 3 TD, INT
- CIN – Joe Burrow – 39/49, 412 yards, 3 TD

**Top rushers**

- DEN – Jaleel McLaughlin – 10 rushes, 69 yards
- CIN – Chase Brown – 20 rushes, 67 yards

**Top receivers**

- DEN – Marvin Mims – 8 receptions, 103 yards, 2 TD
- CIN – Tee Higgins – 11 receptions, 131 yards, 3 TD

With the win, the Bengals improved to 8–8 and remained alive in the playoff race.

==== Week 18: at Pittsburgh Steelers ====
Week 18: Cincinnati Bengals at Pittsburgh Steelers – Game summary

Quarter	1	2	3	4	Total
**Bengals**	10	3	3	3	**19**
Steelers	0	7	0	10	**17**

at Acrisure Stadium, Pittsburgh, Pennsylvania

- Date: January 4
- Game time: 8:00 p.m. EST
- Game weather: Cloudy, 19 °F (−7 °C)
- Game attendance: 65,631
- Referee: John Hussey
- TV announcers (ABC/ESPN/ESPN+): Joe Buck, Troy Aikman and Lisa Salters
- Recap, Game Book

Game information

**First quarter**

- CIN – Ja'Marr Chase 12-yard pass from Joe Burrow (Cade York kick), 9:49. Bengals 7–0. **Drive: 9 plays, 73 yards, 5:11.**
- CIN – Cade York 48-yard field goal, 1:48. Bengals 10–0. **Drive: 11 plays, 37 yards, 6:23.**

**Second quarter**

- PIT – Najee Harris 1-yard run (Chris Boswell kick), 9:54. Bengals 10–7. **Drive: 13 plays, 73 yards, 6:30.**
- CIN – Cade York 27-yard field goal, 0:16. Bengals 13–7. **Drive: 7 plays, 28 yards, 0:32.**

**Third quarter**

- CIN – Cade York 35-yard field goal, 6:56. Bengals 16–7. **Drive: 11 plays, 47 yards, 6:28.**

**Fourth quarter**

- CIN – Cade York 23-yard field goal, 11:02. Bengals 19–7. **Drive: 15 plays, 82 yards, 8:31.**
- PIT – Pat Freiermuth 19-yard pass from Russell Wilson (Chris Boswell kick), 8:07. Bengals 19–14. **Drive: 9 plays, 65 yards, 2:55.**
- PIT – Chris Boswell 54-yard field goal, 2:39. Bengals 19–17. **Drive: 6 plays, 2 yards, 2:35.**

**Top passers**

- CIN – Joe Burrow – 37/46, 277 yards, TD, INT
- PIT – Russell Wilson – 17/31, 148 yards, TD

**Top rushers**

- CIN – Khalil Herbert – 20 rushes, 69 yards
- PIT – Najee Harris – 12 rushes, 36 yards, TD

**Top receivers**

- CIN – Ja'Marr Chase – 10 receptions, 96 yards, TD
- PIT – Pat Freiermuth – 8 receptions, 85 yards, TD

With the win, the Bengals finished 9–8, but were eliminated the following day thanks to the Broncos' win over the Chiefs.

=== Standings ===
==== Division ====
AFC North
	W	L	T	PCT	DIV	CONF	PF	PA	STK
^{(3)} Baltimore Ravens	12	5	0	.706	4–2	8–4	518	361	W4
^{(6)} Pittsburgh Steelers	10	7	0	.588	3–3	7–5	380	347	L4
Cincinnati Bengals	9	8	0	.529	3–3	6–6	472	434	W5
Cleveland Browns	3	14	0	.176	2–4	3–9	258	435	L6

==== Conference ====
AFC
Seed	Team	Division	W	L	T	PCT	DIV	CONF	SOS	SOV	STK
**Division leaders**
1	Kansas City Chiefs	West	15	2	0	.882	5–1	10–2	.488	.463	L1
2	Buffalo Bills	East	13	4	0	.765	5–1	9–3	.467	.448	L1
3	Baltimore Ravens	North	12	5	0	.706	4–2	8–4	.529	.525	W4
4	Houston Texans	South	10	7	0	.588	5–1	8–4	.481	.376	W1
**Wild cards**
5	Los Angeles Chargers	West	11	6	0	.647	4–2	8–4	.467	.348	W3
6 (Note: Pittsburgh clinched the #6 seed over Denver based on head-to-head victory.)	Pittsburgh Steelers	North	10	7	0	.588	3–3	7–5	.502	.453	L4
7	Denver Broncos	West	10	7	0	.588	3–3	6–6	.502	.394	W1
**Did not qualify for the postseason**
8	Cincinnati Bengals	North	9	8	0	.529	3–3	6–6	.478	.314	W5
9 (Note: Indianapolis finished ahead of Miami based on head-to-head victory.)	Indianapolis Colts	South	8	9	0	.471	3–3	7–5	.457	.309	W1
10	Miami Dolphins	East	8	9	0	.471	3–3	6–6	.419	.294	L1
11	New York Jets	East	5	12	0	.294	2–4	5–7	.495	.341	W1
12 (Note: Jacksonville finished ahead of New England and Las Vegas based on conference record. (Jacksonville 4–8 to New England 3–9 to Las Vegas 3–9))	Jacksonville Jaguars	South	4	13	0	.235	3–3	4–8	.478	.265	L1
13 (Note: New England finished ahead of Las Vegas based on strength of victory. (New England .471 to Las Vegas .353))	New England Patriots	East	4	13	0	.235	2–4	3–9	.471	.471	W1
14	Las Vegas Raiders	West	4	13	0	.235	0–6	3–9	.540	.353	L1
15 (Note: Cleveland finished ahead of Tennessee based on strength of victory. (Cleveland .510 to Tennessee .431))	Cleveland Browns	North	3	14	0	.176	2–4	3–9	.536	.510	L6
16	Tennessee Titans	South	3	14	0	.176	1–5	3–9	.522	.431	L6
**Tiebreakers** (Note: When breaking ties for three or more teams under the NFL's rules, they are first broken within divisions, then comparing only the highest ranked remaining team from each division.)
