= Lower Souris National Wildlife Refuge Airplane Hangar =

Historic hangar in North Dakota, United States

- U.S. National Register of Historic Places
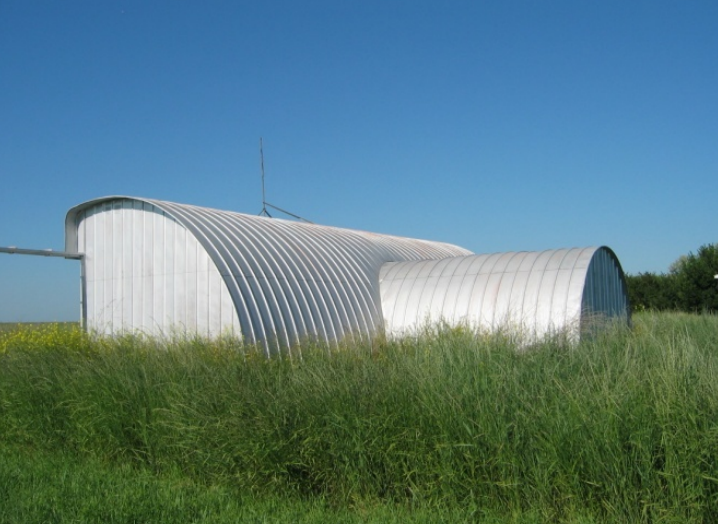
- Lower Souris National Wildlife Refuge Airplane Hangar, c. 2011

- Location within North Dakota Location within the United States
- Nearest city: Upham
- Coordinates: 48.61095°N 100.71944°W
- NRHP reference No.: 11000140
- Added to NRHP: September 20, 2011

The Lower Souris National Wildlife Refuge Airplane Hangar is an airplane hangar at the J. Clark Salyer National Wildlife Refuge near Upham, North Dakota. It is a prefabricated, T-shaped, rounded arch metal structure that was built in 1947 by Butler Manufacturing Company. It served as the home base for an airplane that was used to manage lands set aside for wildlife conservation in North Dakota and surrounding areas. The hangar was listed on the National Register of Historic Places in 2011.

== See also ==
- Upper Souris National Wildlife Refuge
