= Andrei Iosivas =

American football player (born 1999)

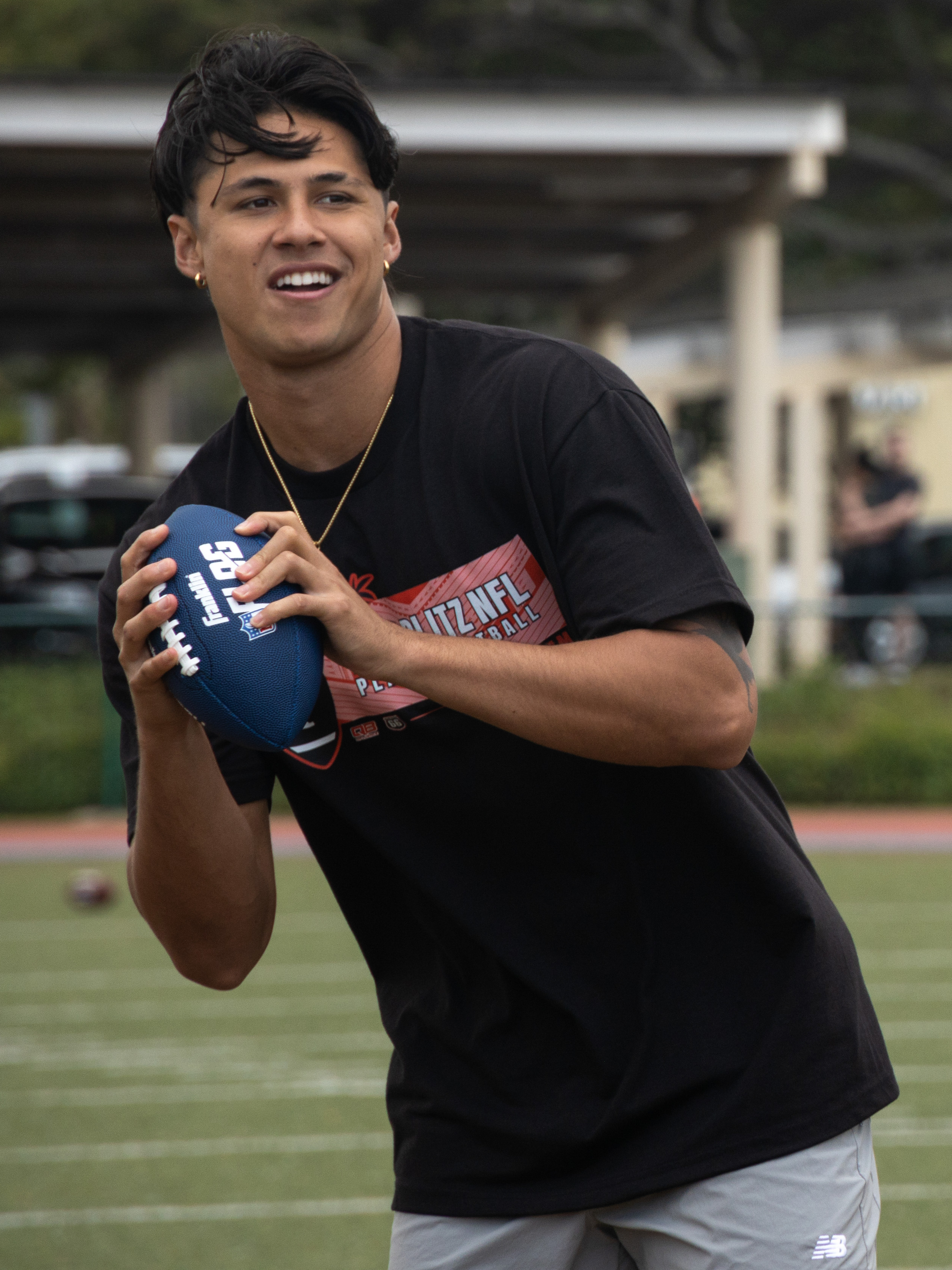
- Iosivas in 2025

No. 80 – Cincinnati Bengals
- Position: Wide receiver
- Roster status: Injured reserve

Personal information
- Born: October 15, 1999 (age 27); Tokyo, Japan
- Listed height: 6 ft 3 in (1.91 m)
- Listed weight: 210 lb (95 kg)

Career information
- High school: Punahou School (Honolulu, Hawaii, U.S.)
- College: Princeton (2018–2022)
- NFL draft: 2023: 6th round, 206th overall pick

Career history
- Cincinnati Bengals (2023–present)

Awards and highlights
- First-team All-Ivy League (2022); Second-team All-Ivy League (2021)

Career NFL statistics as of 2025
- Receptions: 84
- Receiving yards: 1,030
- Receiving average: 12.3
- Receiving touchdowns: 12
- Stats at Pro Football Reference

Andrei Iosivas (born October 15, 1999; /ˈjoʊsiˌvɑːʃ/ YOH-See-VAHSH) is an American professional football wide receiver for the Cincinnati Bengals of the National Football League (NFL). He played college football for the Princeton Tigers and was selected by the Bengals in the sixth round of the 2023 NFL draft.

== Early life ==
Iosivas was born on October 15, 1999, in Tokyo, Japan, to a Filipino mother and Romanian father. He has one younger brother. When he was 4, his family moved to Honolulu, Hawaii, where he attended Punahou School. He became an American citizen when he was 17.

== College career ==
Iosivas played on Princeton's junior varsity team as a freshman. As a sophomore, he caught 18 passes for 263 yards and four touchdowns. Iosivas' initial junior season in 2020 was canceled due to the COVID-19 pandemic and he took a gap year. In 2021, he caught 41 passes for 703 yards and five touchdowns and was named second-team All-Ivy League. Iosivas entered his senior season as the 15th-most athletic player in college football on sportswriter Bruce Feldman's annual "Freaks List." He was named first team All-Ivy League after leading the conference with 66 receptions, 943 receiving yards, and seven touchdown catches.

Iosivas was also a heptathlete on Princeton's track and field team. He set the school record with 5,715 points in 2022 and was named an All-American.

== Professional career ==
Pre-draft measurables
Height	Weight	Arm length	Hand span	Wingspan	40-yard dash	10-yard split	20-yard split	20-yard shuttle	Three-cone drill	Vertical jump	Broad jump	Bench press
6 ft 3 1/8 in (1.91 m)	205 lb (93 kg)	32 in (0.81 m)	8 3/4 in (0.22 m)	6 ft 4 3/4 in (1.95 m)	4.43 s	1.52 s	2.54 s	4.12 s	6.85 s	39.0 in (0.99 m)	10 ft 8 in (3.25 m)	19 reps
All values from the NFL Combine

=== 2023 ===
Iosivas was selected by the Cincinnati Bengals in the sixth round, 206th overall, of the 2023 NFL draft.

Iosivas made his first career reception, a nine-yard contested sideline catch, in the Bengals' Week 5 game against the Arizona Cardinals. In Week 6 against the Seattle Seahawks, Iosivas scored his first career touchdown on a three-yard pass from quarterback Joe Burrow in a 17–13 victory. Iosivas grabbed his second career touchdown on a two-yard pass against the San Francisco 49ers in what ended up being his only target of the game. Iosivas missed the Bengals' Week 11 contest against the Baltimore Ravens due to a knee injury. In Week 18 against the Cleveland Browns, Iosivas played his first career game as a starter, due to Tee Higgins re-aggravating a hamstring injury. Iosivas had a solid game, with five receptions on seven targets for 36 yards and two touchdowns. He finished his rookie season with 15 receptions, 116 yards, and four touchdowns.

=== 2024 ===
Iosivas was named the Bengals starting third wide receiver after the departure of Tyler Boyd. He recorded a two-touchdown game during the Bengals' Week 2 loss to the Kansas City Chiefs. He finished the 2024 season with 36 receptions for 479 yards and six touchdowns.

=== 2025 ===
Iosivas maintained his role as the third wide receiver for the Bengals. On October 5, 2025, Iosivas had five receptions for a career–high 82 yards in a 37–24 loss to the Detroit Lions.

=== 2026 ===
In Week 2 against the Houston Texans, Iosivas tore a ligament in his thumb. He underwent surgery and was placed on injured reserve on September 26, 2026.

== NFL career statistics ==
Legend
**Bold**	Career high

Year	Team	Games		Receiving						Fumbles	
Year	Team	GP	GS	Tgt	Rec	Yds	Avg	Lng	TD	Fum	Lost
2023	CIN	16	1	25	15	116	7.7	16	4	0	0
2024	CIN	**17**	8	**61**	**36**	**479**	**13.3**	**39**	**6**	0	0
2025	CIN	**17**	**9**	58	33	435	13.2	37	2	0	0
Career		50	18	144	84	1,030	12.3	39	12	0	0
