= Balfour, North Dakota =

- City
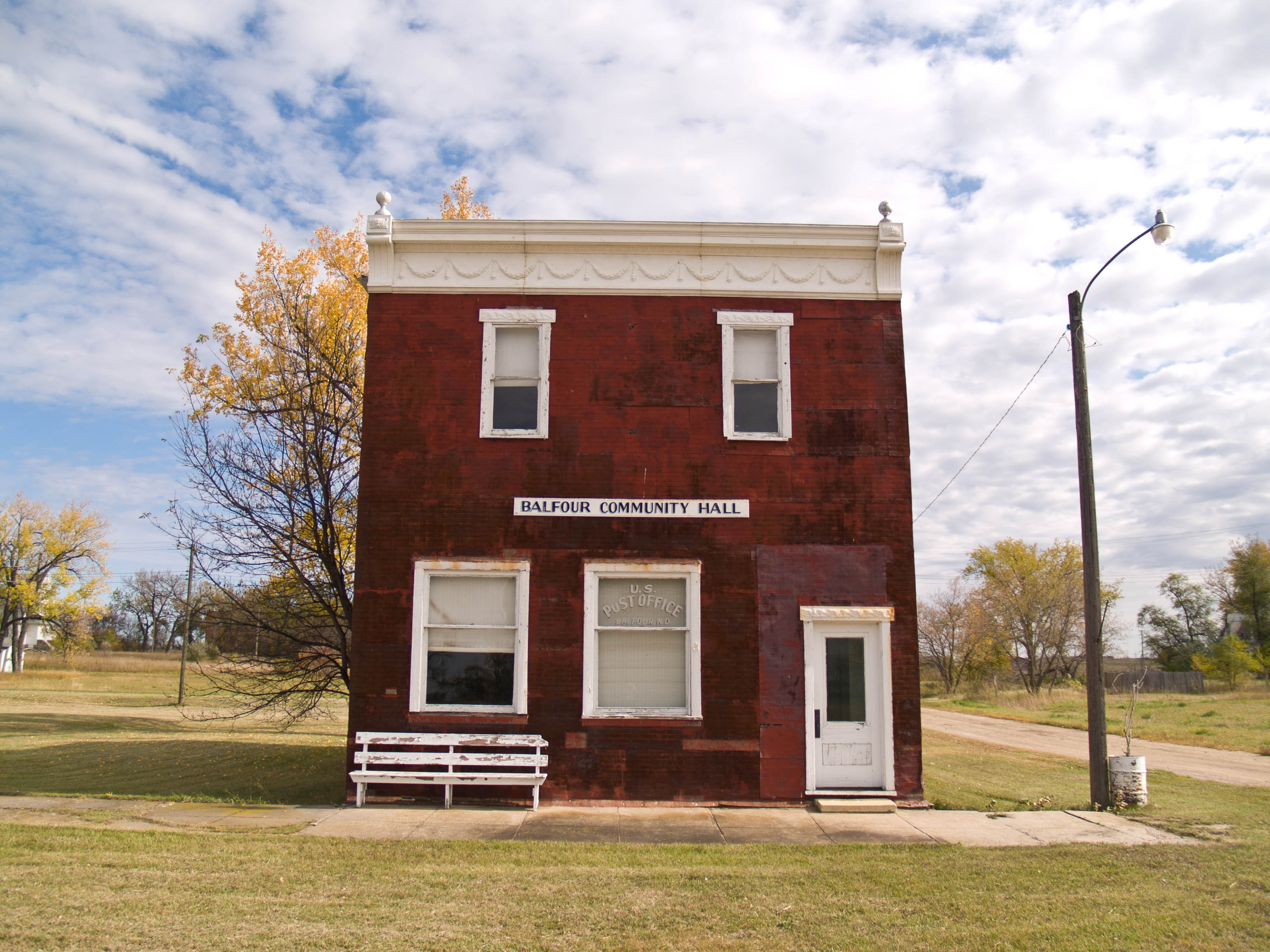
- Balfour Community Hall and Post Office in Balfour

- Coordinates: 47°57′03″N 100°32′03″W
- Country: United States
- State: North Dakota
- County: McHenry
- Founded: 1899

Area
  - Total: 0.56 sq mi (1.46 km^{2})
  - Land: 0.56 sq mi (1.46 km^{2})
  - Water: 0 sq mi (0.00 km^{2})
- Elevation: 1,617 ft (493 m)

Population (2020)
  - Total: 20
  - Estimate (2022): 15
  - Density: 35.4/sq mi (13.68/km^{2})
- Time zone: UTC-6 (Central (CST))
  - Summer (DST): UTC-5 (CDT)
- ZIP code: 58712
- Area code: 701
- FIPS code: 38-04460
- GNIS feature ID: 1035919

Balfour is a city in McHenry County, North Dakota, United States. The population was 20 at the 2020 census. It is part of the Minot Micropolitan Statistical Area.

== History ==
Balfour was founded in 1899 when the Soo Railroad was extended to that point. The city was named for Arthur Balfour, Prime Minister of the United Kingdom. The post office in Balfour was founded in 1899.

== Geography ==
According to the United States Census Bureau, the city has a total area of 0.49 square miles (1.27 km^{2}), all land.

Balfour is located on U.S. Highway 52 southeast of Minot.

== Demographics ==
Historical population
Census	Pop.	Note	%±
1910	399		—
1920	322		−19.3%
1930	197		−38.8%
1940	193		−2.0%
1950	162		−16.1%
1960	159		−1.9%
1970	93		−41.5%
1980	51		−45.2%
1990	33		−35.3%
2000	20		−39.4%
2010	26		30.0%
2020	20		−23.1%
2022 (est.)	15		−25.0%
U.S. Decennial Census; 2020 Census

=== 2010 census ===
As of the census of 2010, there were 26 people in 14 households, including 6 families, in the city. The population density was 53.1 inhabitants per square mile (20.5/km^{2}). There were 18 housing units at an average density of 36.7 per square mile (14.2/km^{2}). The racial makup of the city was 96.2% White and 3.8% Native American. Hispanic or Latino of any race were 3.8%.

Of the 14 households 7.1% had children under the age of 18 living with them, 28.6% were married couples living together, 7.1% had a female householder with no husband present, 7.1% had a male householder with no wife present, and 57.1% were non-families. 50.0% of households were one person and 7.1% were one person aged 65 or older. The average household size was 1.86 and the average family size was 2.83.

The median age was 46 years. 15.4% of residents were under the age of 18; 3.7% were between the ages of 18 and 24; 30.7% were from 25 to 44; 42.2% were from 45 to 64; and 7.7% were 65 or older. The gender makeup of the city was 50.0% male and 50.0% female.

=== 2000 census ===
As of the census of 2000, there were 20 people in 14 households, including 6 families, in the city. The population density was 41.2 inhabitants per square mile (15.9/km^{2}). There were 21 housing units at an average density of 43.2 per square mile (16.7/km^{2}). The racial makup of the city was 100.00% White. Hispanic or Latino of any race were 5.00% of the population.

Of the 14 households none had children under the age of 18 living with them, 35.7% were married couples living together, and 57.1% were non-families. 57.1% of households were one person and 7.1% were one person aged 65 or older. The average household size was 1.43 and the average family size was 2.00.

The age distribution was 5.0% from 18 to 24, 25.0% from 25 to 44, 45.0% from 45 to 64, and 25.0% 65 or older. The median age was 54 years. For every 100 females, there were 122.2 males. For every 100 females age 18 and over, there were 122.2 males.

The median household income was $7,917 and the median family income was $20,625. Males had a median income of $0 versus $0 for females. The per capita income for the city was $5,408. There are 33.3% of families living below the poverty line and 69.2% of the population, including no under eighteens and none of those over 64.

== Notable people ==
- Cordell Volson, American football player
