= Cordell Volson =

American football player (born 1998)

No. 66 – Seattle Seahawks
- Position: Guard
- Roster status: Practice squad

Personal information
- Born: July 20, 1998 (age 28); Balfour, North Dakota, U.S.
- Listed height: 6 ft 6 in (1.98 m)
- Listed weight: 315 lb (143 kg)

Career information
- High school: Drake-Anamoose (Drake, North Dakota)
- College: North Dakota State (2016–2021)
- NFL draft: 2022: 4th round, 136th overall pick

Career history
- Cincinnati Bengals (2022–2025); Tennessee Titans (2026)*; Green Bay Packers (2026)*; Seattle Seahawks (2026–present)*
- * Offseason or practice squad member only

Awards and highlights
- 4× FCS national champion (2017–2019, 2021); 3× First-team All-MVFC (2019–2021)

Career NFL statistics
- Games played: 50
- Games started: 48
- Stats at Pro Football Reference

Cordell Volson (born July 20, 1998) is an American professional football guard for the Seattle Seahawks of the National Football League (NFL). He played college football for the North Dakota State Bison and was selected by the Cincinnati Bengals in the fourth round of the 2022 NFL draft.

== Early life ==
Volson grew up in Balfour, North Dakota, a town with a population of 27, and attended Drake-Anamoose High School. He played offensive line, defensive line, tight end, fullback, linebacker, punter, and kicker on the school's nine-man football team. Volson committed to play college football at North Dakota State over offers from Wyoming and North Dakota.

== College career ==
Volson redshirted his true freshman season at North Dakota State. He played mostly on special teams as a redshirt freshman and sophomore. He was named a starter going into his redshirt junior season and was named first-team All-Missouri Valley Football Conference (MVFC) after starting all 16 of NDSU's games as the team won the 2020 NCAA Division I Football Championship Game. He was a consensus FCS All-American selection during his redshirt senior season, which was shortened and played in the spring of 2021 due to the COVID-19 pandemic in the United States. Volson decided to utilize the extra year of eligibility granted to college athletes who played in the 2020 season due to the coronavirus pandemic and return to NDSU for a sixth season.

== Professional career ==
Pre-draft measurables
Height	Weight	Arm length	Hand span	Wingspan	40-yard dash	10-yard split	20-yard split	20-yard shuttle	Three-cone drill	Vertical jump	Broad jump	Bench press
6 ft 6 1/8 in (1.98 m)	315 lb (143 kg)	33 7/8 in (0.86 m)	10 1/2 in (0.27 m)	6 ft 9 1/8 in (2.06 m)	5.27 s	1.80 s	3.06 s	4.64 s	7.65 s	32.0 in (0.81 m)	8 ft 8 in (2.64 m)	25 reps
All values from NFL Combine/Pro Day

=== Cincinnati Bengals ===
Volson was selected by the Cincinnati Bengals in the fourth round (136th overall) of the 2022 NFL draft. He would outright win the starting left guard job as a rookie over Jackson Carman. Volson would finish the season with 1,107 snaps, the most of any Bengals player that season.

On August 20, 2025, head coach Zac Taylor announced that Volson would require season-ending right shoulder surgery. On August 26, Volson was designated as waived/injured by the Bengals as part of final roster cuts. He reverted to injured reserve the next day.

=== Tennessee Titans ===
On March 12, 2026, Volson signed a one-year contract with the Tennessee Titans. On August 30, he was waived by the Titans as a part of final roster cuts before the start of the regular season.

=== Green Bay Packers ===
On September 17, 2026, Volson signed with the Green Bay Packers' practice squad. On September 29, he was released.

=== Seattle Seahawks ===
On November 12, 2026, Volson signed with the Seattle Seahawks practice squad.
