= J. Clark Salyer National Wildlife Refuge =

Protected area in North Dakota, United States

- IUCN category IV (habitat/species management area)
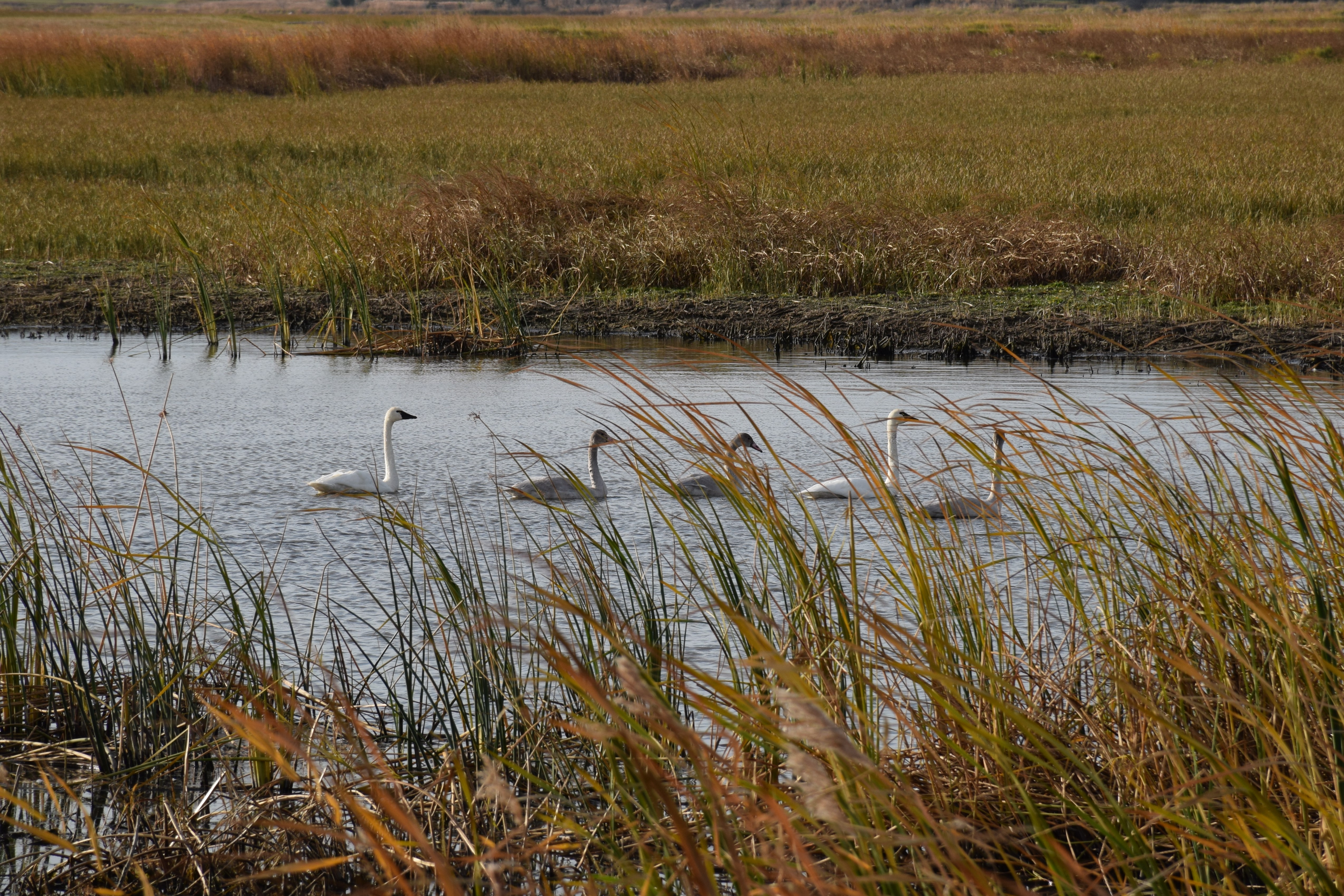
- Tundra swans at the refuge

- Location within the United States
- Location: Bottineau, McHenry counties, North Dakota, United States
- Nearest city: Upham, North Dakota
- Coordinates: 48.61667°N 100.70041°W
- Area: 58,693 acres (237.52 km^{2})
- Established: 1935
- Governing body: U.S. Fish and Wildlife Service
- Website: J. Clark Salyer National Wildlife Refuge

J. Clark Salyer National Wildlife Refuge is located along the Souris River in Bottineau and McHenry Counties in north-central North Dakota. The refuge of 58,693 acres (237.5 km^{2}) extends from the Manitoba border southward for approximately 45 miles (72 km) in an area which was once Glacial Lake Souris. The area is old lake bottom and has extremely flat topography and a high density of temporary wetlands.

The Souris River originates in southern Saskatchewan, flows southwest to Velva, North Dakota, and then generally north to join the Assiniboine River in southern Manitoba. The United States portion of the river is 358 miles (580 km) long and has a drainage basin of 9,000 square miles (23,000 km^{2}); 371 miles (600 km) of river and 15,000 square miles (39,000 km^{2}) of the basin are in Canada. Approximately 75 miles (120 km) of the Souris River are within the boundaries of the Refuge.

The area was designated as the Lower Souris National Wildlife Refuge in 1935. It was renamed to be the J. Clark Salyer National Wildlife Refuge in 1967 in honor of John Clark Salyer II, who was chief during 1934 to 1961 of the U.S. Fish and Wildlife Service's Division of Wildlife Refuges.

== See also ==
- Lower Souris National Wildlife Refuge Airplane Hangar
