= Upham, North Dakota =

Upham
- City
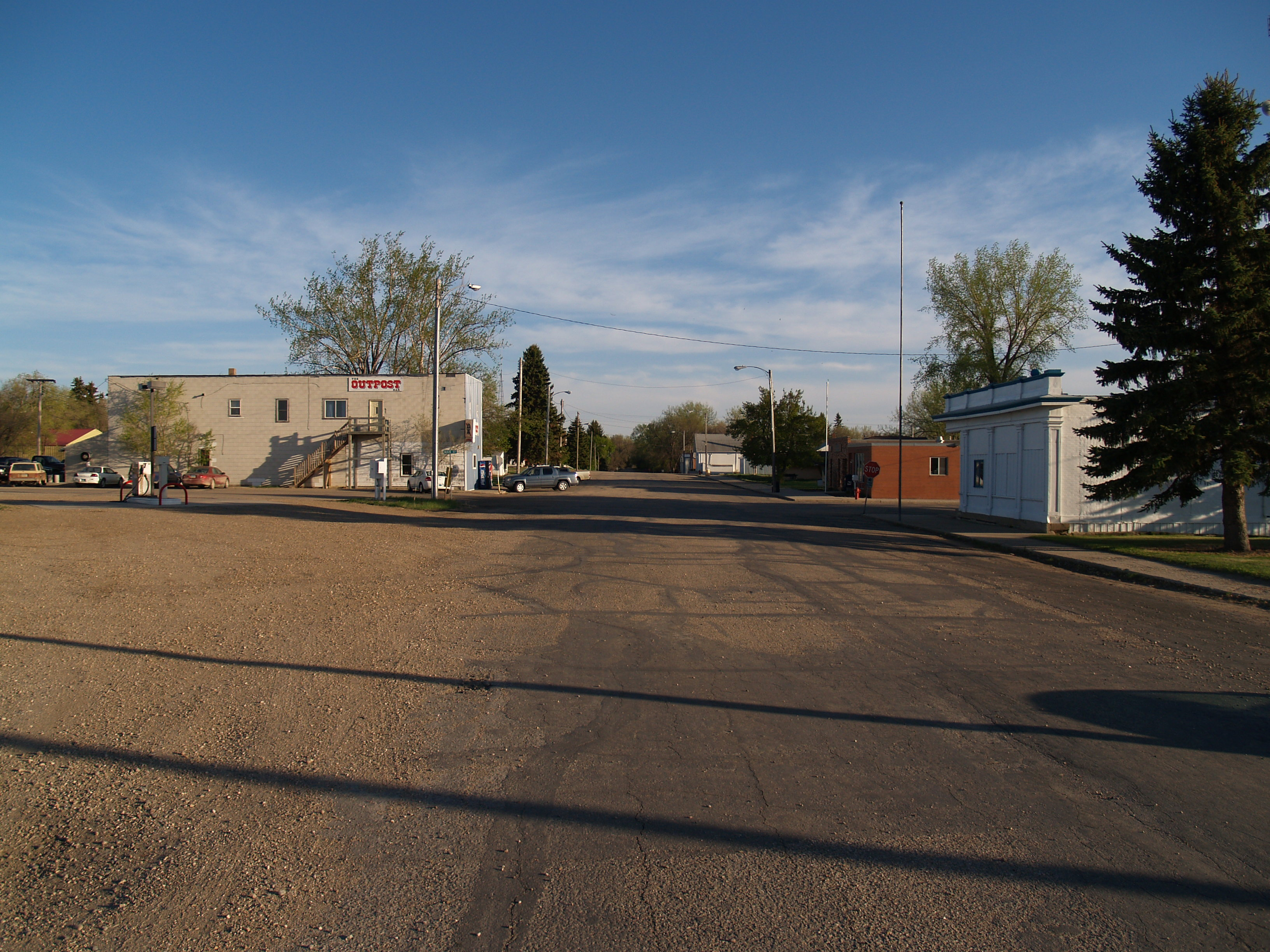
- Upham in May, 2008

- Location of Upham, North Dakota
- Coordinates: 48°34′54″N 100°43′42″W
- Country: United States
- State: North Dakota
- County: McHenry
- Founded: 1905

Government
  - Mayor: Steve Plorin

Area
  - Total: 0.31 sq mi (0.80 km^{2})
  - Land: 0.31 sq mi (0.80 km^{2})
  - Water: 0 sq mi (0.00 km^{2})
- Elevation: 1,447 ft (441 m)

Population (2020)
  - Total: 135
  - Estimate (2022): 131
  - Density: 434.8/sq mi (167.87/km^{2})
- Time zone: UTC-6 (Central (CST))
  - Summer (DST): UTC-5 (CDT)
- ZIP code: 58789
- Area code: 701
- FIPS code: 38-80860
- GNIS feature ID: 1036305

Upham is a city in McHenry County, North Dakota, United States. The population was 135 at the 2020 census. It is part of the Minot Micropolitan Statistical Area. Upham was founded in 1905.

== Geography ==
According to the United States Census Bureau, the city has a total area of 0.33 square miles (0.85 km^{2}), all land.

== Demographics ==
Historical population
Census	Pop.	Note	%±
1910	296		—
1920	196		−33.8%
1930	257		31.1%
1940	243		−5.4%
1950	403		65.8%
1960	333		−17.4%
1970	272		−18.3%
1980	227		−16.5%
1990	205		−9.7%
2000	155		−24.4%
2010	130		−16.1%
2020	135		3.8%
2022 (est.)	131		−3.0%
U.S. Decennial Census; 2020 Census

=== 2010 census ===
As of the census of 2010, there were 130 people, 67 households, and 36 families residing in the city. The population density was 393.9 inhabitants per square mile (152.1/km^{2}). There were 112 housing units at an average density of 339.4 per square mile (131.0/km^{2}). The racial makeup of the city was 96.2% White, 0.8% African American, 0.8% Native American, 0.8% Asian, and 1.5% from two or more races.

There were 67 households, of which 20.9% had children under the age of 18 living with them, 37.3% were married couples living together, 7.5% had a female householder with no husband present, 9.0% had a male householder with no wife present, and 46.3% were non-families. 40.3% of all households were made up of individuals, and 13.4% had someone living alone who was 65 years of age or older. The average household size was 1.94 and the average family size was 2.56.

The median age in the city was 47 years. 18.5% of residents were under the age of 18; 6.1% were between the ages of 18 and 24; 23% were from 25 to 44; 33.9% were from 45 to 64; and 18.5% were 65 years of age or older. The gender makeup of the city was 55.4% male and 44.6% female.

=== 2000 census ===
As of the census of 2000, there were 155 people, 81 households, and 40 families residing in the city. The population density was 479.4 inhabitants per square mile (185.1/km^{2}). There were 120 housing units at an average density of 371.1 per square mile (143.3/km^{2}). The racial makeup of the city was 98.71% White, and 1.29% from two or more races.

There were 81 households, out of which 22.2% had children under the age of 18 living with them, 38.3% were married couples living together, 7.4% had a female householder with no husband present, and 50.6% were non-families. 48.1% of all households were made up of individuals, and 28.4% had someone living alone who was 65 years of age or older. The average household size was 1.91 and the average family size was 2.78.

In the city, the population was spread out, with 20.0% under the age of 18, 5.8% from 18 to 24, 25.8% from 25 to 44, 20.0% from 45 to 64, and 28.4% who were 65 years of age or older. The median age was 44 years. For every 100 females, there were 109.5 males. For every 100 females age 18 and over, there were 96.8 males.

The median income for a household in the city was $21,250, and the median income for a family was $31,458. Males had a median income of $23,750 versus $18,750 for females. The per capita income for the city was $11,187. About 15.1% of families and 24.7% of the population were below the poverty line, including 26.1% of those under the age of eighteen and 29.5% of those 65 or over.

== Climate ==
This climatic region is typified by large seasonal temperature differences, with warm to hot (and often humid) summers and cold (sometimes severely cold) winters. According to the Köppen Climate Classification system, Upham has a humid continental climate, abbreviated "Dfb" on climate maps.

Climate data for Upham 3 N, North Dakota (1991–2020 normals, extremes 1945–present)
Month	Jan	Feb	Mar	Apr	May	Jun	Jul	Aug	Sep	Oct	Nov	Dec	Year
Record high °F (°C)	58 (14)	66 (19)	77 (25)	98 (37)	100 (38)	104 (40)	108 (42)	105 (41)	102 (39)	95 (35)	76 (24)	60 (16)	108 (42)
Mean daily maximum °F (°C)	16.7 (−8.5)	22.1 (−5.5)	34.8 (1.6)	53.0 (11.7)	66.5 (19.2)	75.1 (23.9)	80.5 (26.9)	80.3 (26.8)	70.3 (21.3)	54.2 (12.3)	35.7 (2.1)	21.9 (−5.6)	50.9 (10.5)
Daily mean °F (°C)	6.6 (−14.1)	11.1 (−11.6)	24.3 (−4.3)	40.8 (4.9)	54.2 (12.3)	64.0 (17.8)	68.7 (20.4)	67.0 (19.4)	56.8 (13.8)	42.0 (5.6)	25.7 (−3.5)	12.4 (−10.9)	39.5 (4.2)
Mean daily minimum °F (°C)	−3.6 (−19.8)	0.2 (−17.7)	13.8 (−10.1)	28.7 (−1.8)	41.9 (5.5)	52.8 (11.6)	56.8 (13.8)	53.7 (12.1)	43.3 (6.3)	29.7 (−1.3)	15.7 (−9.1)	3.0 (−16.1)	28.0 (−2.2)
Record low °F (°C)	−45 (−43)	−48 (−44)	−38 (−39)	−17 (−27)	11 (−12)	25 (−4)	31 (−1)	28 (−2)	14 (−10)	−10 (−23)	−29 (−34)	−42 (−41)	−48 (−44)
Average precipitation inches (mm)	0.56 (14)	0.56 (14)	0.77 (20)	1.05 (27)	2.36 (60)	4.21 (107)	2.77 (70)	1.98 (50)	1.60 (41)	1.36 (35)	0.84 (21)	0.71 (18)	18.77 (477)
Average snowfall inches (cm)	8.7 (22)	6.6 (17)	7.0 (18)	4.4 (11)	1.4 (3.6)	0.0 (0.0)	0.0 (0.0)	0.0 (0.0)	0.0 (0.0)	2.7 (6.9)	8.0 (20)	10.6 (27)	49.4 (125)
Average precipitation days (≥ 0.01 in)	7.4	6.2	6.5	6.4	9.7	12.5	9.7	7.9	7.4	7.0	6.8	7.6	95.1
Average snowy days (≥ 0.1 in)	6.9	6.0	5.0	2.3	0.5	0.0	0.0	0.0	0.0	1.4	5.2	7.5	34.8
Source: NOAA
