= List of United States tornadoes from August to December 2025 =

List of tornadoes in the United States

United States tornadoes from August to December 2025
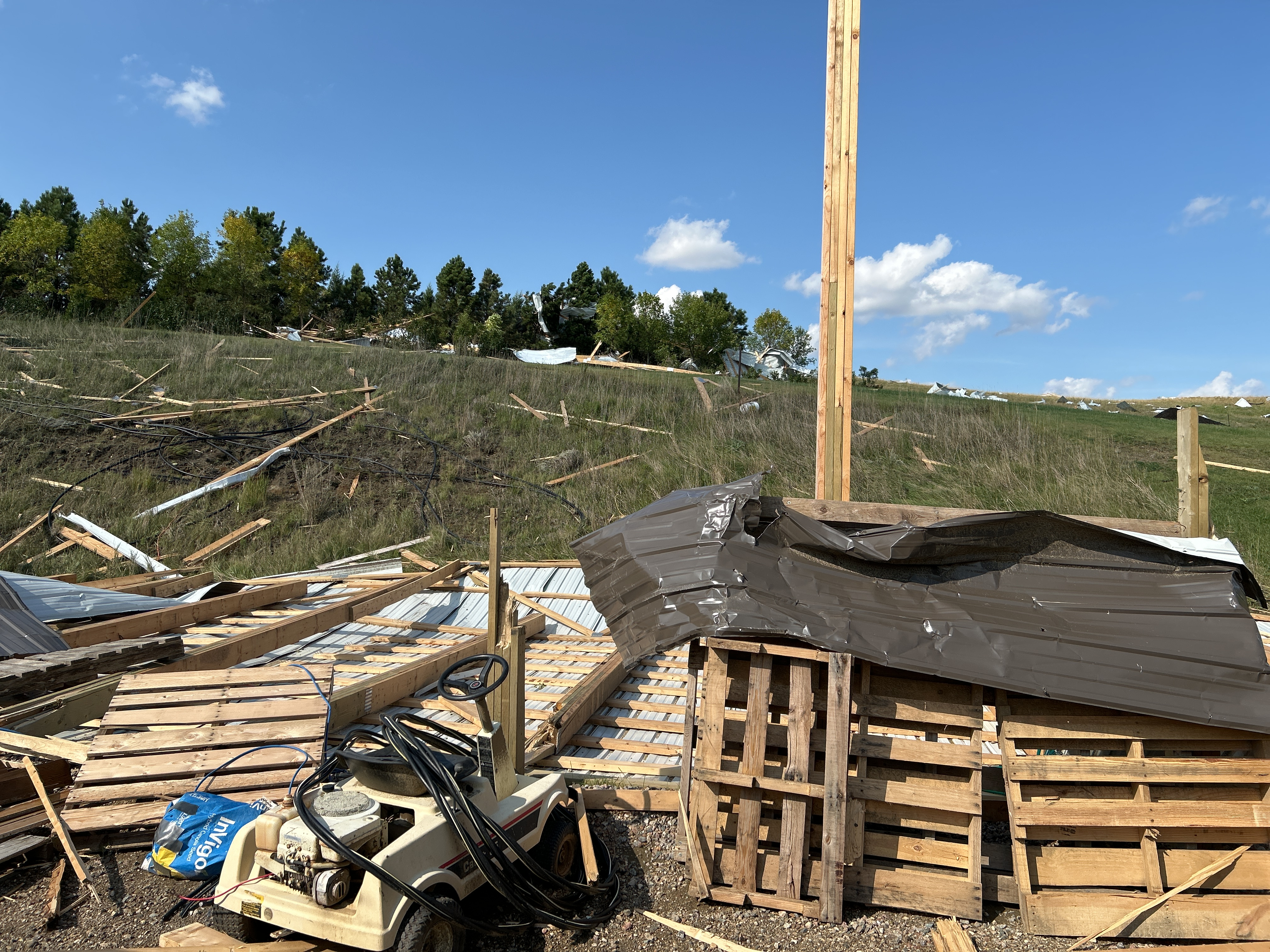
- A large barn destroyed in rural North Dakota after an EF2 tornado on September 14
- Timespan: August 3 – December 28
- Maximum rated tornado: EF2 tornado: Montezuma Creek, Utah on September 13; Cannon Ball, North Dakota on September 14; Denhoff, North Dakota on September 14; Louetta, Texas on November 24; Mount Zion, Illinois on December 28
- Tornadoes: 172
- Fatalities: 0
- Injuries: 11

This page documents all tornadoes confirmed by various weather forecast offices of the National Weather Service in the United States from August to December 2025. Tornado counts are considered preliminary until final publication in the database of the National Centers for Environmental Information. On average, there are 81 confirmed tornadoes in August, 66 in September, 59 in October, 54 in November, and 28 in December.

Similar to July, the northern states nearer the Canadian border are most favored for tornadoes in August, including the Upper Midwest, the Great Lakes, and the Northeastern states, due to the positioning of the summertime jet stream. In addition, there can also be occasional increases in the southern and eastern United States as a result of tornadoes from landfalling tropical cyclones should such occur. Tornadic activity in September is most often associated with landfalling tropical cyclones, particularly in the Southern United States. In years with no tropical cyclone landfalls, tornadic activity can be very sparse, as the stronger mid-latitude cyclones most often associated with the cold season are rarer. In October, tornado activity continues to wane compared to earlier months, with activity most common in states along the Gulf Coast. Tornadoes in November and December are more likely in the southern states due to their proximity to the unstable airmass and warm waters of the Gulf of Mexico, with occasional incursions farther north into the Midwest, particularly in November.

The latter part of 2025 was generally very inactive when it comes to tornado activity, especially in the sometimes active fall months where tornadoes were generally few and far between. August was largely devoid of tornadic activity, with tropical cyclones mainly staying away from the United States mainland and a lack of weather systems in the northern tier of the country. As a result, the month finished below average, with just 54 confirmed tornadoes, none of which were strong. September would finish slightly below average with just 60 confirmed tornadoes despite an anomalous outbreak in North Dakota in the middle of the month, as like with the previous month, no tropical systems would make landfall in the US. Tornado activity in October was very limited, with just 31 tornadoes confirmed, none of them rated as strong. Both November and December were very below average with only sporadic activity, mainly due to the high presence of Arctic air. November had only 12 confirmed tornadoes, the lowest amount since 2012. December had 15 confirmed tornadoes, most of which came from a small outbreak on December 28.

== August ==
Confirmed tornadoes by Enhanced Fujita rating
EFU	EF0	EF1	EF2	EF3	EF4	EF5	Total
28	13	13	0	0	0	0	54

=== August 3 event ===
List of confirmed tornadoes – Sunday, August 3, 2025 (Note: All dates are based on the local time zone where the tornado touched down; however, all times are in Coordinated Universal Time for consistency.)
EF#	Location	County / parish	State	Start coord.	Time (UTC)	Path length	Max. width
EFU	NNW of Horace	Greeley	KS	38.53°N 101.8°W	22:22–22:23	0.01 mi (0.016 km)	50 yd (46 m)
EFU	A brief tornado occurred.						
EFU	WSW of Tryon	McPherson	NE	41.506°N 101.311°W	21:33	0.01 mi (0.016 km)	10 yd (9.1 m)
EFU	A tornado briefly touched down over open rangeland.						
EFU	SW of Tribune	Greeley	KS	38.34°N 101.8815°W	22:44–22:46	0.79 mi (1.27 km)	50 yd (46 m)
EFU	Multiple storm chasers reported a tornado.						
EFU	S of Tribune	Hamilton	KS	38.2331°N 101.8059°W	00:01–00:04	0.62 mi (1.00 km)	25 yd (23 m)
EFU	This brief tornado remained over open country.						

=== August 4 event ===
List of confirmed tornadoes – Monday, August 4, 2025
EF#	Location	County / parish	State	Start coord.	Time (UTC)	Path length	Max. width
EFU	ENE of St. Cloud	Osceola	FL	28.2879°N 81.1579°W	23:14–23:22	2.23 mi (3.59 km)	100 yd (91 m)
EFU	A short-lived tornado touched down over rural land.						

=== August 5 event ===
List of confirmed tornadoes – Tuesday, August 5, 2025
EF#	Location	County / parish	State	Start coord.	Time (UTC)	Path length	Max. width
EFU	WSW of Leola	McPherson	SD	45.71°N 98.98°W	00:54	0.01 mi (0.016 km)	5 yd (4.6 m)
EFU	This brief tornado remained over an open field.						

=== August 6 event ===
List of confirmed tornadoes – Wednesday, August 6, 2025
EF#	Location	County / parish	State	Start coord.	Time (UTC)	Path length	Max. width
EFU	N of Halsey	Linn	OR	44.401°N 123.1043°W	23:14–23:16	0.09 mi (0.14 km)	30 yd (27 m)
EFU	A landspout tornado was observed in the fields near Central Linn High School.						

=== August 8 event ===
List of confirmed tornadoes – Friday, August 8, 2025
EF#	Location	County / parish	State	Start coord.	Time (UTC)	Path length	Max. width
EF1	NW of Hannaford	Griggs	ND	47.375°N 98.264°W	08:04–08:05	1.12 mi (1.80 km)	30 yd (27 m)
EF1	A high-end EF1 tornado did scouring in a wheat field. Moving northeast, it completely destroyed a large pole barn before dissipating.						
EF0	NNE of Mose	Griggs	ND	47.651°N 98.411°W	08:06–08:07	0.55 mi (0.89 km)	20 yd (18 m)
EF0	A weak tornado damaged crops.						
EF0	NNW of Hatton to ESE of Northwood	Grand Forks	ND	47.691°N 97.475°W	08:47–08:51	2.14 mi (3.44 km)	20 yd (18 m)
EF0	This tornado tracked through farmland, damaging crops and snapping large tree branches.						
EF1	ESE of Hatton	Traill	ND	47.6266°N 97.3957°W	08:47–08:53	3.92 mi (6.31 km)	100 yd (91 m)
EF1	A tornado damaged a farmstead by tearing the garage door off a large shed, uprooting a tree, and snapping or uprooting numerous large branches. Along its path, more trees were damaged, and high-resolution satellite imagery revealed crop damage.						
EF1	McCanna	Grand Forks	ND	48.0007°N 97.7393°W	08:48–08:51	2.99 mi (4.81 km)	75 yd (69 m)
EF1	This rain-wrapped tornado tracked intermittently, destroying two grain bins and damaging shelterbelt trees along its path.						
EF1	SSW of Larimore	Grand Forks	ND	47.8661°N 97.649°W	08:48–08:50	1.29 mi (2.08 km)	100 yd (91 m)
EF1	This brief tornado caused damage to trees.						
EF1	E of Kempton to SSE of Arvilla	Grand Forks	ND	47.815°N 97.529°W	08:51–08:58	4.8 mi (7.7 km)	70 yd (64 m)
EF1	A tornado produced some crop damage, tipped over an irrigation pivot system and damaged trees in shelterbelts.						
EF1	NE of Hatton	Grand Forks	ND	47.7155°N 97.3666°W	08:54–08:56	2.05 mi (3.30 km)	30 yd (27 m)
EF1	Large cottonwood trees were snapped or uprooted. Crop damage also occurred.						
EF0	ESE of Kempton	Grand Forks	ND	47.803°N 97.49°W	08:55–09:00	0.2 mi (0.32 km)	20 yd (18 m)
EF0	A very brief tornado damaged sunflowers in a field.						
EF0	ESE of Kempton	Grand Forks	ND	47.8009°N 97.4733°W	08:57–09:02	0.16 mi (0.26 km)	20 yd (18 m)
EF0	This extremely brief tornado flattened sunflowers and damaged a shelterbelt.						
EF1	Mekinock	Grand Forks	ND	48.0155°N 97.3663°W	09:05–09:06	0.13 mi (0.21 km)	30 yd (27 m)
EF1	A garage was completely destroyed and two others were damaged.						
EF1	NW of Grand Forks	Grand Forks	ND	47.9808°N 97.2013°W	09:12–09:17	5.74 mi (9.24 km)	50 yd (46 m)
EF1	This high-end EF1 tornado intermittently touched down northwest of Grand Forks International Airport and tracked northeast. Early in its path, the tornado caused moderate damage, including a mobile home being rolled onto its side with an occupant inside who required rescue. As it continued, several homes sustained significant damage, with multiple garages destroyed. The tornado then crossed I-29, where additional damage occurred to electrical transmission infrastructure, including damaged wooden power poles. The circulation weakened and lifted shortly before reaching the Red River of the North.						
EF1	Grand Forks, ND to East Grand Forks, MN	Grand Forks (ND), Polk (MN)	ND, MN	47.8897°N 97.083°W	09:12–09:20	4.05 mi (6.52 km)	400 yd (370 m)
EF1	This tornado produced intermittent damage as it tracked northeast across Grand Forks and into East Grand Forks. Early in its path, a light pole was bent at an intersection, indicating localized stronger winds. The tornado primarily caused tree damage along its track, snapping and damaging trees near residential areas and community facilities. It crossed the Red River of the North into Minnesota, where additional tree damage was observed before the circulation lifted near the Red Lake River.						
EF0	E of Seffner	Hillsborough	FL	28°N 82.27°W	21:41	0.02 mi (0.032 km)	10 yd (9.1 m)
EF0	A brief landspout tornado lofted foliage.						

=== August 9 event ===
List of confirmed tornadoes – Saturday, August 9, 2025
EF#	Location	County / parish	State	Start coord.	Time (UTC)	Path length	Max. width
EF0	NE of Fish Creek	Door	WI	45.1557°N 87.1963°W	20:54–20:55	0.25 mi (0.40 km)	32 yd (29 m)
EF0	A weak tornado damaged several trees, including uprooting one, in Peninsula State Park. The tornado likely crossed into Eagle Harbor and became a waterspout, which was widely reported by the public and captured on video.						
EF1	NE of Leonard	Shelby	MO	39.9003°N 92.1614°W	23:22–23:23	0.36 mi (0.58 km)	75 yd (69 m)
EF1	This brief tornado caused damage to a farm.						
EF1	ESE of Leonard to N of Epworth	Shelby	MO	39.8877°N 92.1455°W	23:23–23:26	3.07 mi (4.94 km)	100 yd (91 m)
EF1	This high-end EF1 tornado caused heavy damage to a farm, sweeping away an entire outbuilding and damaging the roofs of several other structures.						
EFU	NW of Vernon	Yuma	CO	39.9627°N 102.3553°W	23:43–23:44	0.06 mi (0.097 km)	50 yd (46 m)
EFU	A trained storm spotter observed a brief tornado.						
EFU	SE of Vernon	Yuma	CO	39.9326°N 102.2503°W	23:52–00:07	4.59 mi (7.39 km)	75 yd (69 m)
EFU	This tornado was observed by a storm chaser. No damage occurred.						

=== August 10 event ===
List of confirmed tornadoes – Sunday, August 10, 2025
EF#	Location	County / parish	State	Start coord.	Time (UTC)	Path length	Max. width
EF0	S of Lorton	Otoe	NE	40.5911°N 96.0644°W	07:49–07:52	2.36 mi (3.80 km)	10 yd (9.1 m)
EF0	A weak tornado tracked through cornfields.						
EF0	NW of Deer Trail	Arapahoe	CO	39.66°N 104.14°W	22:25–22:29	0.37 mi (0.60 km)	50 yd (46 m)
EF0	A tornado occurred over open fields.						
EFU	NE of Kahoka	Clark	MO	40.4317°N 91.7068°W	00:10–00:12	0.14 mi (0.23 km)	10 yd (9.1 m)
EFU	A very brief tornado was recorded.						
EFU	NE of St. Francisville, MO	Lee	IA	40.4769°N 91.5283°W	00:41–00:42	0.03 mi (0.048 km)	10 yd (9.1 m)
EFU	A brief tornado occurred over farmland.						
EFU	NW of Mooar	Lee	IA	40.483°N 91.5015°W	00:51–00:52	0.1 mi (0.16 km)	10 yd (9.1 m)
EFU	This tornado occurred over open fields. No damage occurred.						

=== August 11 event ===
List of confirmed tornadoes – Monday, August 11, 2025
EF#	Location	County / parish	State	Start coord.	Time (UTC)	Path length	Max. width
EFU	E of Utica to W of Hillsboro	Van Buren	IA	40.8154°N 91.7747°W	04:05–04:10	2.21 mi (3.56 km)	10 yd (9.1 m)
EFU	A tornado tore a path through farmland with the damage limited to just crops.						

=== August 12 event ===
List of confirmed tornadoes – Tuesday, August 12, 2025
EF#	Location	County / parish	State	Start coord.	Time (UTC)	Path length	Max. width
EF0	NNE of Middlefield	Geauga	OH	41.5012°N 81.0523°W	00:45–00:47	0.24 mi (0.39 km)	75 yd (69 m)
EF0	A brief tornado touched down near SR 528 northeast of Middlefield, uprooting a large tree and snapping several large limbs. It crossed the highway and damaged three buildings on a nearby property, including extensive roof damage to two small outbuildings and roof damage to a larger barn. Roofing material was blown several hundred feet onto the roadway and three livestock were injured.						

=== August 13 event ===
List of confirmed tornadoes – Wednesday, August 13, 2025
EF#	Location	County / parish	State	Start coord.	Time (UTC)	Path length	Max. width
EF1	New London	Huron	OH	41.0795°N 82.4043°W	06:04–06:05	0.33 mi (0.53 km)	50 yd (46 m)
EF1	This tornado struck the New London Recreation Area, toppling a bullpen at the baseball field before moving northeast into Grove Street Cemetery where it snapped a large hardwood tree and broke several other large limbs. The tornado then entered residential areas, bringing down several tree tops and limbs and damaging two homes. Residents reporting their homes shaking. The tornado then uprooted a large tree that landed on a house, causing roof damage, and another tree fell onto power lines, snapping three utility poles and blocking a roadway. Before dissipating, it also knocked down several panel fences.						

=== August 14 event ===
List of confirmed tornadoes – Thursday, August 14, 2025
EF#	Location	County / parish	State	Start coord.	Time (UTC)	Path length	Max. width
EF0	Western Holden Beach	Brunswick	NC	33.9034°N 78.3605°W	21:43–21:44	0.11 mi (0.18 km)	50 yd (46 m)
EF0	A waterspout moved ashore from the Atlantic Ocean, tossing beach furniture and causing minor damage to palm trees.						

=== August 15 event ===
List of confirmed tornadoes – Friday, August 15, 2025
EF#	Location	County / parish	State	Start coord.	Time (UTC)	Path length	Max. width
EFU	S of St. George, UT	Mohave	AZ	36.9978°N 113.5659°W	23:40–23:45		
EFU	A landspout occurred over open desert.						

=== August 16 event ===
List of confirmed tornadoes – Saturday, August 16, 2025
EF#	Location	County / parish	State	Start coord.	Time (UTC)	Path length	Max. width
EF0	SW of Hazel	Hamlin	SD	44.7249°N 97.4282°W	08:41–08:45	0.13 mi (0.21 km)	40 yd (37 m)
EF0	A tornado touched down in cropland and tracked northeast, producing tree damage before reaching a farm where several empty grain bins were torn from their foundations and destroyed. Its path ended in a nearby crop field east-southeast of Hazel.						
EFU	NE of Homer	Vermilion	IL	40.0591°N 87.9106°W	23:47–23:48	0.13 mi (0.21 km)	40 yd (37 m)
EFU	A brief tornado occurred in a corn field.						

=== August 17 event ===
List of confirmed tornadoes – Sunday, August 17, 2025
EF#	Location	County / parish	State	Start coord.	Time (UTC)	Path length	Max. width
EFU	NNE of Crystal Lake	Winnebago	IA	43.2651°N 93.7775°W	23:13–23:15	0.4 mi (0.64 km)	35 yd (32 m)
EFU	A landspout tracked over farm fields causing no damage.						

=== August 18 event ===
List of confirmed tornadoes – Monday, August 18, 2025
EF#	Location	County / parish	State	Start coord.	Time (UTC)	Path length	Max. width
EFU	ENE of Cleves	Grundy	IA	42.4803°N 93.0217°W	12:16–12:19	1.39 mi (2.24 km)	50 yd (46 m)
EFU	A tornado caused no damage as it tracked through croplands.						
EFU	N of Holland	Grundy	IA	42.4084°N 92.857°W	12:25–12:32	4.53 mi (7.29 km)	50 yd (46 m)
EFU	This tornado moved through agricultural fields, inflicting no damage.						
EFU	W of Fern	Grundy	IA	42.4895°N 92.8552°W	12:25–12:26	0.62 mi (1.00 km)	35 yd (32 m)
EFU	This brief tornado left a notable track through farmland, causing no damage.						
EFU	NNE of Las Vegas	San Miguel	NM	35.6678°N 105.1686°W	20:45–20:47	0.05 mi (0.080 km)	10 yd (9.1 m)
EFU	Local media shared a photo of a landspout tornado.						

=== August 19 event ===
List of confirmed tornadoes – Tuesday, August 19, 2025
EF#	Location	County / parish	State	Start coord.	Time (UTC)	Path length	Max. width
EFU	N of Del Rio	Val Verde	TX	29.5°N 100.88°W	20:15–20:20	0.01 mi (0.016 km)	1 yd (0.91 m)
EFU	This landspout occurred next to the Amistad Reservoir and remained over open country.						
EFU	E of Corrales	Sandoval	NM	35.232°N 106.5437°W	21:35–21:37	0.67 mi (1.08 km)	40 yd (37 m)
EFU	A landspout caused no damage over rural land.						

=== August 20 event ===
List of confirmed tornadoes – Wednesday, August 20, 2025
EF#	Location	County / parish	State	Start coord.	Time (UTC)	Path length	Max. width
EF0	W of Orme	Franklin	TN	35.0051°N 85.9612°W	20:47–20:48	0.26 mi (0.42 km)	100 yd (91 m)
EF0	A brief tornado uprooted several trees.						

=== August 21 event ===
List of confirmed tornadoes – Thursday, August 21, 2025
EF#	Location	County / parish	State	Start coord.	Time (UTC)	Path length	Max. width
EF1	NNW of Rosholt, SD	Richland	ND	45.9401°N 96.77°W	22:29–22:50	1.81 mi (2.91 km)	30 yd (27 m)
EF1	A slow-moving tornado formed in a marshy field, then tracked east-northeast into a grove of trees where numerous trunks were snapped. It continued across a corn field, leaving areas of scouring before reaching another grove where more large branches and tree trunks were broken. The tornado lifted shortly thereafter.						
EFU	NW of Norcross	Grant	MN	45.8869°N 96.2227°W	23:18–23:23	0.25 mi (0.40 km)	30 yd (27 m)
EFU	A landspout occurred. No damage was reported.						
EFU	W of Norcross	Grant	MN	45.87°N 96.24°W	23:18–23:23	0.25 mi (0.40 km)	30 yd (27 m)
EFU	This landspout occurred at the same time as the previous tornado. No damage was reported.						

=== August 28 event ===
List of confirmed tornadoes – Thursday, August 28, 2025
EF#	Location	County / parish	State	Start coord.	Time (UTC)	Path length	Max. width
EFU	SE of Pahokee	Palm Beach	FL	26.78°N 80.64°W	19:43		
EFU	A brief landspout remained over rural farmland causing no damage.						
EF0	SW of Randlett	Cotton	OK	34.1595°N 98.4847°W	21:10	0.1 mi (0.16 km)	10 yd (9.1 m)
EF0	A landspout was photographed.						
EFU	SW of Providence Village	Denton	TX	33.23°N 96.97°W	21:25	0.01 mi (0.016 km)	20 yd (18 m)
EFU	A brief landspout had several photos and videos taken of it.						

=== August 29 event ===
List of confirmed tornadoes – Sunday, August 29, 2025
EF#	Location	County / parish	State	Start coord.	Time (UTC)	Path length	Max. width
EFU	SSE of Bombay	Goodhue	MN	44.2595°N 92.8858°W	22:05–22:10	0.38 mi (0.61 km)	25 yd (23 m)
EFU	This landspout occurred over farmland.						

=== August 30 event ===
List of confirmed tornadoes – Saturday, August 30, 2025
EF#	Location	County / parish	State	Start coord.	Time (UTC)	Path length	Max. width
EFU	SW of Beulah	Mercer	ND	47.12°N 101.93°W	18:52–18:54	0.5 mi (0.80 km)	50 yd (46 m)
EFU	A tornado occurred in an open field.						

== September ==
Confirmed tornadoes by Enhanced Fujita rating
EFU	EF0	EF1	EF2	EF3	EF4	EF5	Total
34	11	12	3	0	0	0	60

=== September 4 event ===
List of confirmed tornadoes – Thursday, September 4, 2025
EF#	Location	County / parish	State	Start coord.	Time (UTC)	Path length	Max. width
EF1	NE of Cluster Springs	Halifax	VA	36.637°N 78.887°W	20:51–20:52	0.3 mi (0.48 km)	225 yd (206 m)
EF1	Approximately 50-100 trees were snapped and the outer wall of a modular home was damaged.						
EF0	Ava	Oneida	NY	43.407°N 75.499°W	21:57–22:05	3 mi (4.8 km)	100 yd (91 m)
EF0	A tornado touched down southwest of Ava, causing convergent tree damage. In town, a chicken coop was lofted, a tree was knocked onto a pig pen, a shed door was damaged, and more scattered tree damage occurred, though houses were largely spared. The tornado continued east-northeast, where a weakened tree fell onto a farmhouse, causing only minor impacts before the tornado ultimately dissipated.						
EF0	SSW of Bernadotte to W of New Sweden	Nicollet	MN	44.4188°N 94.3251°W	23:29–23:33	3.5 mi (5.6 km)	40 yd (37 m)
EF0	This short-lived tornado damaged crops, a barn, and a tree stand. A pronounced track in fields noted via high-resolution satellite imagery.						
EF0	NE of Norseland	Nicollet	MN	44.4265°N 94.0704°W	23:45–23:46	0.99 mi (1.59 km)	40 yd (37 m)
EF0	Minor tree damage occurred on a farmstead.						
EF0	ESE of Quarryville	Lancaster	PA	39.8729°N 76.1242°W	01:31–01:32	0.15 mi (0.24 km)	30 yd (27 m)
EF0	This brief tornado touched down and lifted the roof off a dugout at the Solanco Youth Baseball Association, caused crop damage near a church, and dissipated before reaching a nearby wooded residential area.						

=== September 6 event ===
List of confirmed tornadoes – Saturday, September 6, 2025
EF#	Location	County / parish	State	Start coord.	Time (UTC)	Path length	Max. width
EF1	Paxton	Worcester	MA	42.317°N 71.9292°W	20:02–20:03	0.17 mi (0.27 km)	50 yd (46 m)
EF1	This brief tornado touched down in Paxton, snapping and uprooting several softwood trees as it crossed the area. It caused significant tree damage before lifting.						
EF1	ENE of Paxton	Worcester	MA	42.3216°N 71.8904°W	20:06–20:07	0.13 mi (0.21 km)	100 yd (91 m)
EF1	A brief tornado uprooted several trees.						
EF1	Holden	Worcester	MA	42.3332°N 71.8618°W	20:08–20:09	0.15 mi (0.24 km)	100 yd (91 m)
EF1	This tornado briefly touched down in Holden causing significant tree damage.						
EF1	W of Berlin	Worcester	MA	42.3854°N 71.6642°W	20:25–20:27	0.6 mi (0.97 km)	150 yd (140 m)
EF1	A tornado touched down and snapped or uprooted numerous trees.						
EF1	Stow	Middlesex	MA	42.4298°N 71.551°W	20:30–20:34	2.38 mi (3.83 km)	100 yd (91 m)
EF1	An intermittent tornado caused significant tree damage throughout Stow.						

=== September 7 event ===
List of confirmed tornadoes – Sunday, September 7, 2025
EF#	Location	County / parish	State	Start coord.	Time (UTC)	Path length	Max. width
EF0	Palm Bay	Brevard	FL	27.9697°N 80.6529°W	18:36–18:39	0.28 mi (0.45 km)	50 yd (46 m)
EF0	A brief tornado touched down in southern Palm Bay and tracked northward. The tornado caused minor vegetative damage, including broken tree branches and a small oak tree being blown down. Structural impacts were limited, with a few fence panels damaged, awnings twisted, and a shed lifted. Two nearby homes sustained minor roof damage from missing shingles.						

=== September 8 event ===
List of confirmed tornadoes – Monday, September 8, 2025
EF#	Location	County / parish	State	Start coord.	Time (UTC)	Path length	Max. width
EFU	NNE of Rosston	Harper	OK	36.928°N 99.872°W	22:57	0.1 mi (0.16 km)	20 yd (18 m)
EFU	A storm spotter reported a brief tornado.						
EFU	S of Perryton	Ochiltree	TX	36.3706°N 100.8153°W	00:05–00:06	0.09 mi (0.14 km)	25 yd (23 m)
EFU	A brief tornado occurred in an open field.						

=== September 9 event ===
List of confirmed tornadoes – Tuesday, September 9, 2025
EF#	Location	County / parish	State	Start coord.	Time (UTC)	Path length	Max. width
EFU	S of Flagler	Kit Carson	CO	39.0974°N 103.07°W	21:42–21:43	0.01 mi (0.016 km)	50 yd (46 m)
EFU	A landspout was photographed.						

=== September 12 event ===
List of confirmed tornadoes – Friday, September 12, 2025
EF#	Location	County / parish	State	Start coord.	Time (UTC)	Path length	Max. width
EFU	NE of Vail	Pima	AZ	32.1134°N 110.5709°W	17:11	0.01 mi (0.016 km)	1 yd (0.91 m)
EFU	A landspout was photographed in the Rincon Mountains.						
EFU	SE of Wheelock	Williams	ND	48.27°N 103.2°W	17:59–18:01	0.21 mi (0.34 km)	50 yd (46 m)
EFU	This tornado remained over a field.						
EFU	W of Garneill	Judith Basin	MT	46.76°N 109.8°W	20:24		
EFU	A funnel cloud kicked up dust for under a minute, causing no damage.						

=== September 13 event ===
List of confirmed tornadoes – Saturday, September 13, 2025
EF#	Location	County / parish	State	Start coord.	Time (UTC)	Path length	Max. width
EFU	N of Montezuma Creek	San Juan	UT	37.33°N 109.26°W	18:30–18:45	0.25 mi (0.40 km)	25 yd (23 m)
EFU	A short-lived tornado remained over open country.						
EF2	NE of Montezuma Creek	San Juan	UT	37.35°N 109.23°W	18:58–19:45	1.1 mi (1.8 km)	50 yd (46 m)
EF2	This strong tornado occurred in the Navajo Nation and destroyed two homes along with a sheep corral and barn. Two 800-gallon water barrels were swept away and two horse trailers were also damaged. Additional damage to a cow corral and three vehicles was noted.						
EF1	E of Powderhorn	Saguache	CO	38.3°N 106.85°W	19:07–19:12	0.84 mi (1.35 km)	95 yd (87 m)
EF1	A tornado occurred at 11,300 ft (3,400 m) above sea level, causing tree damage in a very remote area. The tornado left a scar that was viewable from satellite imagery.						

=== September 14 event ===
List of confirmed tornadoes – Sunday, September 14, 2025
EF#	Location	County / parish	State	Start coord.	Time (UTC)	Path length	Max. width
EF1	E of Mobridge	Walworth	SD	45.5059°N 100.3162°W	17:40–17:44	3.99 mi (6.42 km)	200 yd (180 m)
EF1	A high-end EF1 tornado began southeast of Mobridge along SD 1804 where it caused minor damage to a grain silo before tipping two semi-trailers further northwest. It destroyed an outbuilding south of US 12 by ripping off the roof and collapsing walls. The tornado then bent a power pole and overturned a camper along the highway. After crossing US 12, it took down six power poles before dissipating with no further reported damage.						
EFU	NE of Wakpala	Corson	SD	45.739°N 100.4146°W	18:10–18:11	0.01 mi (0.016 km)	1 yd (0.91 m)
EFU	Storm chasers reported a brief tornado over open land.						
EFU	SE of Fort Yates	Emmons	ND	46.031°N 100.535°W	18:26–18:30	1.83 mi (2.95 km)	50 yd (46 m)
EFU	A storm chaser observed a tornado that caused no damage near the eastern shore of Lake Oahe.						
EF2	SE of Cannon Ball	Emmons	ND	46.274°N 100.524°W	19:08–19:24	6.09 mi (9.80 km)	200 yd (180 m)
EF2	This strong tornado began near the Beaver Bay Recreation Area, causing grass and crop damage before denting the south side of a large grain bin. It then destroyed a large pole barn, scattering debris several hundred feet and embedding large boards into the ground. Farm equipment inside was damaged, a door from the barn was left resting on a combine, and limited tree damage was noted just north of the property. Storm chasers observed the tornado continuing north before roping out.						
EFU	N of Livona	Emmons	ND	46.555°N 100.538°W	18:54–19:01	3.32 mi (5.34 km)	50 yd (46 m)
EFU	A tornado occurred north of the Hazelton Recreation Area.						
EF1	NE of Menoken	Burleigh	ND	46.82°N 100.501°W	20:27–20:34	2.71 mi (4.36 km)	100 yd (91 m)
EF1	This tornado touched down east of Menoken and tracked northwest. The most significant damage occurred at a farmstead north of I-94, where the roof of a pole barn was torn off and debris was scattered. A trampoline and a large barn door were displaced, and nearby trees were impacted. Farther northwest, the tornado caused shingle damage to a single-wide trailer and damaged several old trees, snapping large branches or uprooting them entirely.						
EFU	N of Driscoll	Burleigh	ND	46.912°N 100.132°W	20:40–20:44	1.84 mi (2.96 km)	50 yd (46 m)
EFU	This tornado tracked through fields causing some crop damage.						
EFU	SE of Baldwin	Burleigh	ND	46.961°N 100.596°W	20:50–20:58	4.49 mi (7.23 km)	50 yd (46 m)
EFU	This rain-wrapped tornado was spotted by storm chasers.						
EFU	N of Arena	Burleigh	ND	47.14°N 100.175°W	21:01–21:12	2.8 mi (4.5 km)	50 yd (46 m)
EFU	Storm chasers reported a tornado that eventually became multi-vortex. No known damage occurred.						
EFU	NW of Wing	Burleigh	ND	47.17°N 100.34°W	21:08–21:15	2.85 mi (4.59 km)	50 yd (46 m)
EFU	This likely intermittent tornado was recorded by storm chasers and locals from the area.						
EFU	SE of Wilton	Burleigh	ND	47.11°N 100.69°W	21:09–21:16	3.82 mi (6.15 km)	50 yd (46 m)
EFU	A tornado was observed by storm chasers.						
EFU	NE of El Dorado	Butler	KS	37.9149°N 96.7744°W	21:15–21:20	0.33 mi (0.53 km)	10 yd (9.1 m)
EFU	This brief tornado moved across El Dorado Lake, causing no damage.						
EFU	S of Denhoff (1st tornado)	Burleigh, Sheridan	ND	47.309°N 100.23°W	21:29–21:38	5.19 mi (8.35 km)	100 yd (91 m)
EFU	An intermittent rope tornado damaged corn crops.						
EF2	S of Denhoff to S of Lincoln Valley	Sheridan	ND	47.376°N 100.25°W	21:31–21:59	12.89 mi (20.74 km)	800 yd (730 m)
EF2	This low-end EF2 tornado touched down, destroying a large pole barn and damaging nearby buildings. A double-wide mobile home lost its roof and a wall while a car was displaced and trees sustained heavy damage. As it moved north, a single-wide mobile home was flipped, debris was scattered up to a quarter mile, and hay bales were damaged. Additional damage occurred west and north of Denhoff, including hay bales embedded in a road sign, missing roof panels on a farm outbuilding, damage to a grain bin, and destruction of a children’s playset. Multiple areas of tree damage were noted before the tornado dissipated north of Denhoff.						
EFU	S of Denhoff (2nd tornado)	Sheridan	ND	47.448°N 100.262°W	21:42–21:44	0.97 mi (1.56 km)	50 yd (46 m)
EFU	A satellite of the Denhoff EF2 remained over open land.						
EFU	SE of Mercer	Sheridan, McLean	ND	47.436°N 100.633°W	21:51–21:56	3.1 mi (5.0 km)	50 yd (46 m)
EFU	This tornado remained over open land, causing no damage.						
EF1	W of Mercer	McLean	ND	47.485°N 100.738°W	22:00–22:31	8.69 mi (13.99 km)	250 yd (230 m)
EF1	A high-end EF1 tornado touched down near Mercer, striking a farm just west of town where numerous trees were snapped or uprooted. A pole barn was partially destroyed, scattering debris up to a quarter mile and embedding large boards in the ground. Several support beams buried deep in the soil were pulled out. The tornado then crossed ND 200, damaging trees on the north side, before continuing north and destroying an unanchored mobile home on wheels north of Mercer. It dissipated shortly afterward, with storm chasers and security camera footage confirming its end.						
EFU	SE of Kief	Sheridan	ND	47.771°N 100.372°W	22:25–22:30	1.25 mi (2.01 km)	50 yd (46 m)
EFU	A storm chaser reported a tornado that caused no damage.						
EFU	S of Butte	McLean, McHenry	ND	47.75°N 100.68°W	22:59–23:14	7.27 mi (11.70 km)	100 yd (91 m)
EFU	This tornado touched down and tracked due north towards Butte. As storm chasers who were chasing this tornado stopped for gas in town, the outer edge of the tornado moved over them. Some debris was blown in the video but no damage was reported. The tornado ended just north of town.						
EFU	W of Balfour to SW of Karlsruhe	McHenry	ND	47.956°N 100.623°W	23:26–23:38	6.88 mi (11.07 km)	50 yd (46 m)
EFU	Storm chasers viewed an intermittent tornado before it eventually became rain-wrapped.						
EFU	WNW of Karlsruhe	McHenry	ND	48.09°N 100.68°W	23:45–23:54	3.39 mi (5.46 km)	100 yd (91 m)
EFU	A TDS was noted on radar and a tornado was observed. No damage was found.						
EFU	NW of Karlsruhe to SE of Granville	McHenry	ND	48.179°N 100.71°W	23:58–00:04	1.75 mi (2.82 km)	50 yd (46 m)
EFU	Storm chasers reported a tornado that caused no damage.						
EFU	S of Granville	McHenry	ND	48.249°N 100.839°W	00:20–00:21	0.15 mi (0.24 km)	50 yd (46 m)
EFU	A trained spotter reported a brief tornado.						

=== September 16 event ===
List of confirmed tornadoes – Tuesday, September 16, 2025
EF#	Location	County / parish	State	Start coord.	Time (UTC)	Path length	Max. width
EFU	SSW of Burlington	Kit Carson	CO	39.1892°N 102.3037°W	22:11–22:17	0.01 mi (0.016 km)	50 yd (46 m)
EFU	This landspout occurred near a farmstead but caused no damage.						
EFU	E of Sahuarita	Pima	AZ	31.9704°N 110.9032°W	23:25–23:30	0.01 mi (0.016 km)	1 yd (0.91 m)
EFU	Multiple photos and videos were taken of a landspout that inflicted no damage.						

=== September 17 event ===
List of confirmed tornadoes – Wednesday, September 17, 2025
EF#	Location	County / parish	State	Start coord.	Time (UTC)	Path length	Max. width
EFU	WNW of Arnegard	McKenzie	ND	47.83°N 103.47°W	19:42–19:48	1.14 mi (1.83 km)	50 yd (46 m)
EFU	A tornado touched down and remained in an open field.						

=== September 18 event ===
List of confirmed tornadoes – Thursday, September 18, 2025
EF#	Location	County / parish	State	Start coord.	Time (UTC)	Path length	Max. width
EFU	Ponce Inlet	Volusia	FL	29.116°N 80.9466°W	15:23–15:24	0.08 mi (0.13 km)	10 yd (9.1 m)
EFU	A brief waterspout moved ashore, becoming a landspout before dissipating as it hit dunes on a beach.						
EFU	N of Wyndmere	Richland	ND	46.37°N 97.11°W	20:40–20:42	0.2 mi (0.32 km)	10 yd (9.1 m)
EFU	A trained spotter reported a weak tornado that caused no damage.						
EFU	Northern Palmdale	Los Angeles	CA	34.65°N 118.1°W	22:05		
EFU	A landspout was photographed over open land.						

=== September 20 event ===
List of confirmed tornadoes – Saturday, September 20, 2025
EF#	Location	County / parish	State	Start coord.	Time (UTC)	Path length	Max. width
EF0	ENE of Mason City to W of New Holland	Mason	IL	40.2146°N 89.6584°W	20:09–20:15	2.36 mi (3.80 km)	40 yd (37 m)
EF0	This tornado moved due south, remaining over fields and inflicted minor damage to trees.						

=== September 22 event ===
List of confirmed tornadoes – Monday, September 22, 2025
EF#	Location	County / parish	State	Start coord.	Time (UTC)	Path length	Max. width
EFU	ENE of Lake Ann	Grand Traverse	MI	44.7366°N 85.7768°W	20:50–20:51	0.1 mi (0.16 km)	10 yd (9.1 m)
EFU	A brief tornado was recorded quickly touching down and dissipating. This is the first documented tornado in Grand Traverse County since 1969.						
EF0	Mount Sterling	Crawford	WI	43.322°N 90.934°W	21:04–21:07	0.75 mi (1.21 km)	40 yd (37 m)
EF0	An outbuilding, a silo, some roof shingles and corn were all minorly damaged.						
EF0	W of Bellaire	Antrim	MI	44.9746°N 85.2849°W	21:50–21:51	0.14 mi (0.23 km)	10 yd (9.1 m)
EF0	This tornado began as a waterspout over Torch Lake before making landfall on the eastern shore where it inflicted minor tree damage.						
EF1	Bellaire	Antrim	MI	44.9744°N 85.2077°W	22:02–22:04	0.85 mi (1.37 km)	30 yd (27 m)
EF1	A few trees were snapped and uprooted in Bellaire.						
EF0	NW of Powersville to Brooksville	Bracken	KY	38.6563°N 84.1131°W	21:02–21:11	4.1 mi (6.6 km)	500 yd (460 m)
EF0	The tornado first produced damage near Powersville, where several trees and large branches were knocked down. It then tracked northeast, causing intermittent tree damage along its path. The most significant impacts occurred northwest of downtown Brooksville, where numerous trees were downed and several homes sustained minor roof and siding damage. One residence in this area lost a large portion of its roof, marking the location of the strongest winds. Farther northeast, the tornado caused occasional minor tree and structural damage before destroying a barn and uprooting large sycamore trees near the end of its path.						

=== September 24 event ===
List of confirmed tornadoes – Wednesday, September 24, 2025
EF#	Location	County / parish	State	Start coord.	Time (UTC)	Path length	Max. width
EF1	S of Benton	Bossier	LA	32.6711°N 93.737°W	17:35–17:37	0.27 mi (0.43 km)	36 yd (33 m)
EF1	A brief tornado touched down just south of Benton near the Lost River Estates development, where it blew down a fence and snapped a softwood tree. It then crossed a road, snapping large branches at the entrance to a warehouse, damaging a residential entrance, and uprooting a road sign. A trash can was lofted into a nearby field. The tornado lifted abruptly afterward, with no damage found at the warehouse, adjacent barns, or nearby homes.						

=== September 25 event ===
List of confirmed tornadoes – Wednesday, September 25, 2025
EF#	Location	County / parish	State	Start coord.	Time (UTC)	Path length	Max. width
EF0	Callicoon Center to Lew Beach	Sullivan	NY	41.8264°N 74.9563°W	15:57–16:25	15.96 mi (25.69 km)	150 yd (140 m)
EF0	A high-end EF0 tornado began near Callicoon Center, where several small trees fell onto a house, causing only minimal damage. As it tracked uphill, the tornado crossed an older damage path from April 2023, snapping larger trees in a convergent pattern and reaching its peak width. The circulation briefly weakened before reorganizing, producing additional cyclonic tree damage as it crossed NY 17 and continued northeast. It dissipated near Lew Beach along the Sullivan–Ulster county lines after leaving no further damage.						
EF0	Northern St. Petersburg	Pinellas	FL	27.87°N 82.66°W	16:36–16:37	0.01 mi (0.016 km)	10 yd (9.1 m)
EF0	A landspout developed and remained over a hill in the Pinellas County Solid Waste Disposal Complex.						

=== September 26 event ===
List of confirmed tornadoes – Thursday, September 26, 2025
EF#	Location	County / parish	State	Start coord.	Time (UTC)	Path length	Max. width
EFU	WNW of Palm Gardens, NV	San Bernardino	CA	35.228°N 114.939°W	21:40–21:45	Unknown	Unknown
EFU	Several photos were taken of a landspout that remained over open desert.						

=== September 27 event ===
List of confirmed tornadoes – Friday, September 27, 2025
EF#	Location	County / parish	State	Start coord.	Time (UTC)	Path length	Max. width
EFU	NE of Tonopah	Maricopa	AZ	33.5842°N 112.8518°W	23:30–23:35	0.1 mi (0.16 km)	30 yd (27 m)
EFU	A landspout occurred over open desert.						

== October ==
Confirmed tornadoes by Enhanced Fujita rating
EFU	EF0	EF1	EF2	EF3	EF4	EF5	Total
6	11	14	0	0	0	0	31

=== October 3 event ===
List of confirmed tornadoes – Friday, October 3, 2025
EF#	Location	County / parish	State	Start coord.	Time (UTC)	Path length	Max. width
EFU	SSE of Fairmount to N of Jamaica	Vermilion	IL	40.02°N 87.811°W	18:03–18:07	0.35 mi (0.56 km)	30 yd (27 m)
EFU	This landspout remained over open fields.						

=== October 6 event ===
List of confirmed tornadoes – Monday, October 6, 2025
EF#	Location	County / parish	State	Start coord.	Time (UTC)	Path length	Max. width
EF0	ESE of Whitehall	Livingston	LA	30.23°N 90.61°W	05:03–05:08	1.51 mi (2.43 km)	30 yd (27 m)
EF0	A weak tornado occurred over marshland near the Blind River, damaging vegetation.						
EF1	N of Hammond to E of Independence	Tangipahoa	LA	30.53°N 90.43°W	08:59–09:14	7.81 mi (12.57 km)	75 yd (69 m)
EF1	This tornado touched down on the northwest side of the Hammond Northshore Regional Airport, snapping large branches. It continued north-northwest across LA 443 and LA 1064, breaking smaller branches. The tornado strengthened as it moved further north, damaging the roof of a house and snapping a hardwood tree in half. It reached peak intensity near LA 442, where more hardwood trees were snapped. The tornado then weakened as it crossed the Tangipahoa River, snapping large branches, before lifting shortly before LA 40.						
EF0	NW of Robert to SE of Loranger	Tangipahoa	LA	30.57°N 90.34°W	09:57–10:04	2.76 mi (4.44 km)	50 yd (46 m)
EF0	A weak tornado touched down just north of LA 445, snapping large branches. It continued north through forested areas, breaking additional small and large branches before lifting along LA 40.						
EF1	NE of Lees Landing	Tangipahoa	LA	30.42°N 90.3°W	10:11–10:21	3.51 mi (5.65 km)	100 yd (91 m)
EF1	A tornado touched down, snapping small tree limbs before intensifying as it moved north. Along LA 22, the tornado snapped groups of softwood trees. The tornado maintained this intensity as it continued due north where additional trees were snapped and part of the roof was removed from a manufactured home. It then weakened as it tracked northeast, breaking small tree limbs and leaning small trees in a convergent pattern before lifting.						

=== October 15 event ===
List of confirmed tornadoes – Wednesday, October 15, 2025
EF#	Location	County / parish	State	Start coord.	Time (UTC)	Path length	Max. width
EF1	E of Alta	Teton	WY	43.7411°N 110.9906°W	19:35–19:37	0.99 mi (1.59 km)	125 yd (114 m)
EF1	This tornado occurred in the Caribou–Targhee National Forest, causing a swath of tree damage over mountainous terrain. The tornado began at about 7,900 ft (2,400 m) of elevation and ended at approximately 6,900 ft (2,100 m). This is only the 3rd documented tornado in Teton County since reliable records began in 1950.						

=== October 18 event ===
List of confirmed tornadoes – Saturday, October 18, 2025
EF#	Location	County / parish	State	Start coord.	Time (UTC)	Path length	Max. width
EF1	NW of Friendship	Hot Spring	AR	34.2756°N 93.1016°W	20:50–20:55	0.8 mi (1.3 km)	100 yd (91 m)
EF1	A brief tornado uprooted and snapped several trees north of AR 128.						
EF1	ENE of Swampers	Madison	LA	32.2256°N 91.3768°W	00:45–00:53	4.87 mi (7.84 km)	350 yd (320 m)
EF1	An EF1 tornado touched down south of the Hunters Bend area and moved northeast through the community, blowing down several large trees across power lines. As it continued through forested areas, trees were snapped and uprooted. Additional damage occurred near the Tensas River, where a mobile home, several barns, and outbuildings were damaged. A 12x24-foot hunting shed was destroyed with debris carried into a nearby tree line. The tornado then crossed the Tensas River bend into the Tensas River National Wildlife Refuge, snapping or uprooting numerous trees before dissipating.						
EF0	SW of Yazoo City	Yazoo	MS	32.8012°N 90.4917°W	02:29–02:33	3.03 mi (4.88 km)	50 yd (46 m)
EF0	This weak tornado downed a pecan tree onto a home but did not damage the home. Intermittent vegetation and tree damage occurred before the tornado lifted.						

=== October 19 event ===
List of confirmed tornadoes – Sunday, October 19, 2025
EF#	Location	County / parish	State	Start coord.	Time (UTC)	Path length	Max. width
EF0	SSE of Brandon to NW of Puckett	Rankin	MS	32.1578°N 89.9474°W	07:07–07:17	6.72 mi (10.81 km)	75 yd (69 m)
EF0	Numerous large and small tree branches were downed.						
EF1	Western Nicholasville	Jessamine	KY	37.8748°N 84.6119°W	15:05–15:06	0.65 mi (1.05 km)	20 yd (18 m)
EF1	This tornado is believed to have been a cold air funnel that managed to touch down briefly. The tornado caused tree damage before security camera footage confirmed a small funnel that blew out two garage doors and pulled a section of wall away from a warehouse.						

=== October 24 event ===
List of confirmed tornadoes – Friday, October 24, 2025
EF#	Location	County / parish	State	Start coord.	Time (UTC)	Path length	Max. width
EFU	SE of Muleshoe	Bailey	TX	34.19°N 102.68°W	20:45–20:46		
EFU	A brief landspout occurred in an open field.						
EFU	NE of Dimmitt (1st tornado)	Castro	TX	34.56°N 102.33°W	21:30–21:50		
EFU	This landspout occurred simultaneously with the 2140 UTC landspout and remained over open fields.						
EFU	NE of Dimmitt (2nd tornado)	Castro	TX	34.555°N 102.339°W	21:40–21:52		
EFU	This landspout occurred simultaneously with the 2130 UTC landspout and remained over open fields.						
EFU	W of Dimmitt	Castro	TX	34.55°N 102.329°W	22:04–22:06		
EFU	Local broadcast media captured a brief landspout.						
EF1	SW of Kendalia to Northern Canyon Lake	Kendall, Blanco, Comal	TX	29.9329°N 98.5778°W	04:35–04:58	20.05 mi (32.27 km)	300 yd (270 m)
EF1	This long-tracked, high-end EF1 tornado moved east across rural Kendall and Comal counties, producing mainly tree damage early in its path. Near the intersection of US 281 and FM 306, the tornado briefly crossed into Blanco County before moving into Comal County, where it downed several utility poles near a gas station. As it continued east, it caused tree, fence, and roof damage in the Indian Hill and Mystic Shores areas before weakening and dissipating east of FM 306.						

=== October 25 event ===
List of confirmed tornadoes – Saturday, October 25, 2025
EF#	Location	County / parish	State	Start coord.	Time (UTC)	Path length	Max. width
EF0	S of Anderson to Richards	Grimes	TX	30.46°N 95.98°W	07:30–07:38	9.9 mi (15.9 km)	100 yd (91 m)
EF0	A weak tornado caused both tree and structural damage. One home had all its windows shattered and a French door pulled from the back while another suffered extensive roof damage. Metal roofing was twisted around a nearby tree.						
EF0	Sulphur	Calcasieu	LA	30.217°N 93.3428°W	04:45–04:48	2.07 mi (3.33 km)	50 yd (46 m)
EF0	This weak tornado touched down in Sulphur, causing minor roof, awning, and fence damage to several homes as it tracked through McMurry Park and the Maplewood neighborhood. Trees were damaged and a few power lines were pulled from their poles. The tornado crossed I-10 near a Lowe’s where additional tree damage was noted along the interstate before dissipating nearby.						

=== October 26 event ===
List of confirmed tornadoes – Sunday, October 26, 2025
EF#	Location	County / parish	State	Start coord.	Time (UTC)	Path length	Max. width
EF0	E of Whitehall	Livingston	LA	30.27°N 90.65°W	09:38–09:41	1.38 mi (2.22 km)	75 yd (69 m)
EF0	A weak tornado produced mainly tree damage and minor roof damage to one home on LA 1039. A large metal canopy was thrown several dozen yards, and satellite imagery revealed additional defoliation and minor tree damage in nearby marsh areas.						
EF1	SE of Amelia to WSW of Bayou Cane	Terrebonne	LA	29.55°N 90.98°W	10:22–10:40	7.46 mi (12.01 km)	250 yd (230 m)
EF1	This tornado tracked northeast through remote marshland southwest of Humphreys, producing a narrow but distinct path of vegetation damage. It intensified as it crossed the Intracoastal Waterway and Lake Hackberry, where numerous trees were displaced. Radar and satellite imagery confirmed the tornado’s presence and strength before it weakened and lifted prior to reaching structures in Humphreys.						
EF1	NE of Hammond to E of Tickfaw	Tangipahoa	LA	30.54°N 90.38°W	10:38–10:56	2.07 mi (3.33 km)	75 yd (69 m)
EF1	A tornado tracked began south of the Tangipahoa River and tracked north, primarily causing tree damage. The most intense damage occurred where several large trees were snapped before it crossed the river. Additional tree damage and the destruction of a large tent occurred at Camp Living Waters before the tornado moved into inaccessible areas beyond the camp.						
EF1	Gautier	Jackson	MS	30.373°N 88.6438°W	14:22–14:39	4.5 mi (7.2 km)	100 yd (91 m)
EF1	This tornado touched down south of US 90, heavily damaging a restaurant and causing scattered tree damage. It crossed the highway, producing minor damage near Mississippi Gulf Coast Community College and additional roof and tree damage through nearby neighborhoods. As it continued northeast, the tornado strengthened, damaging roofs and outbuildings at two apartment complexes and causing partial wall collapse at a condominium building. It then weakened, producing isolated tree and roof damage before dissipating near I-10.						
EF0	N of Gautier to NW of Escatawpa	Jackson	MS	30.4495°N 88.6245°W	14:41–14:56	5.61 mi (9.03 km)	125 yd (114 m)
EF0	A high-end EF0 tornado formed east of the Hickory Hills neighborhood in Jackson County, Mississippi, shortly after the preceding tornado dissipated. It tracked northeast through the Pascagoula River basin, leaving visible scarring in marsh vegetation and snapping. Radar indicated a debris sginature as the tornado weakened and lifted over the river basin near MS 63, with no structural damage occurring.						
EF0	Eastern Pascagoula to Southern Moss Point	Jackson	MS	30.3697°N 88.5135°W	15:13–15:20	1.74 mi (2.80 km)	200 yd (180 m)
EF0	A high-end EF0 tornado touched down near an elementary school, producing minor roof and tree damage as it moved northeast. It reached peak strength where several trees were uprooted in a convergent pattern. As it continued towards a subdivision, the tornado began to weaken and turn northward, crossing US 90 before dissipating shortly thereafter.						
EF1	NNE of Elberta	Baldwin	AL	30.4336°N 87.5877°W	03:52–03:56	1.17 mi (1.88 km)	125 yd (114 m)
EF1	This tornado briefly touched down, causing minor tree damage. It uprooted a few trees and tore sections of roofing from a small barn. As it moved northeast, a larger barn lost much of its metal roof paneling and additional trees were uprooted before the tornado lifted.						

=== October 27 event ===
List of confirmed tornadoes – Monday, October 27, 2025
EF#	Location	County / parish	State	Start coord.	Time (UTC)	Path length	Max. width
EFU	E of Port Isabel	Cameron	TX	26.07°N 97.16°W	06:51	0.01 mi (0.016 km)	10 yd (9.1 m)
EFU	A waterspout made landfall, ripping apart a small building housing a generator.						
EF1	Mexico Beach	Bay	FL	29.9437°N 85.4144°W	11:30–11:45	1.22 mi (1.96 km)	270 yd (250 m)
EF1	This waterspout came ashore in Mexico Beach, damaging the roofs and siding of several beachfront homes. The roof of a hotel was torn off and thrown across US 98 into an RV park where several RVs were overturned or heavily damaged, resulting in ten injuries. As the tornado continued inland, it caused scattered roof damage, mainly peeling off metal roofing, before dissipating west of the Bay-Gulf county line.						
EF0	Northern Mexico Beach	Bay	FL	29.9585°N 85.4388°W	11:35–11:36	0.55 mi (0.89 km)	50 yd (46 m)
EF0	A brief tornado touched down and crossed US 98, damaging fencing and signs in a new construction neighborhood.						
EF0	N of Rigby	Jefferson	ID	43.6845°N 111.92°W	20:45–20:50	0.14 mi (0.23 km)	50 yd (46 m)
EF0	A tornado uprooted two large pine trees, flipped an RV, damaged an outbuilding and partially destroyed a sunroom on a home.						

=== October 28 event ===
List of confirmed tornadoes – Tuesday, October 28, 2025
EF#	Location	County / parish	State	Start coord.	Time (UTC)	Path length	Max. width
EF1	N of Lindale to WNW of Red Springs	Smith	TX	32.5612°N 95.4081°W	19:12–19:27	4.41 mi (7.10 km)	137 yd (125 m)
EF1	This tornado began and moved east, crossing FM 1804, where it caused roof damage to several homes and snapped numerous trees. It intensified as it continued southeast, uprooting trees, damaging outbuildings, and removing parts of roofs from multiple residences. The most severe damage occurred when a brick façade collapsed on one home and a flatbed trailer was lofted into the air. The tornado weakened as it turned southeast and lifted after causing additional roof and tree damage near its endpoint.						
EF1	Kilgore	Gregg, Rusk	TX	32.3735°N 94.9148°W	20:22–20:29	2.53 mi (4.07 km)	169 yd (155 m)
EF1	A tornado touched down west of Kilgore, snapping and uprooting trees and damaging multiple manufactured homes. As it moved eastward into the city, two businesses lost most of their roofs along SH 42, and additional tree damage occurred in nearby parks. The tornado moved slightly southeast into Rusk County, damaging trees and roofs in several neighborhoods, with debris impacting a few homes before lifting near US 259.						

== November ==
Confirmed tornadoes by Enhanced Fujita rating
EFU	EF0	EF1	EF2	EF3	EF4	EF5	Total
0	6	5	1	0	0	0	12

=== November 9 event ===
List of confirmed tornadoes – Sunday, November 9, 2025
EF#	Location	County / parish	State	Start coord.	Time (UTC)	Path length	Max. width
EF0	SW of Deltaville	Middlesex	VA	37.535°N 76.366°W	02:35–02:36	0.46 mi (0.74 km)	50 yd (46 m)
EF0	This high-end EF0 tornado began as a waterspout over the Piankatank River. It then moved onshore near Bland Point, where it snapped and uprooted multiple trees, damaged windows and siding with wind-driven debris, destroyed pool and patio furniture, damaged railings and a garage roof, tossed heavy outdoor chairs over 40 yards (37 m), bent a metal pool cover frame against marble pillars, and damaged a dock. The tornado then weakened as it tracked briefly along the shoreline before dissipating.						

=== November 18 event ===
List of confirmed tornadoes – Tuesday, November 18, 2025
EF#	Location	County / parish	State	Start coord.	Time (UTC)	Path length	Max. width
EF0	E of Aguila	Maricopa	AZ	33.9365°N 113.0132°W	23:23	1.11 mi (1.79 km)	30 yd (27 m)
EF0	A brief tornado was recorded as it crossed US 60. North of the highway, a RV trailer was flipped, a garage lost its roof and other vehicles received minor damage.						
EF1	E of Hickman to NW of Jordan	Fulton	KY	36.5644°N 89.1367°W	00:42–00:48	5.64 mi (9.08 km)	30 yd (27 m)
EF1	A narrow tornado caused sporadic tree and power pole damage mainly between KY 94 and KY 166.						

=== November 20 event ===
List of confirmed tornadoes – Thursday, November 20, 2025
EF#	Location	County / parish	State	Start coord.	Time (UTC)	Path length	Max. width
EF0	Southeastern Tulsa	Tulsa	OK	36.1027°N 95.8346°W	21:59–22:00	0.4 mi (0.64 km)	40 yd (37 m)
EF0	This very weak tornado snapped small tree limbs.						
EF1	NE of Jacksonville	Cherokee	TX	31.9978°N 95.2293°W	03:04–03:07	0.7 mi (1.1 km)	120 yd (110 m)
EF1	An EF1 tornado touched down east of SH 135, where it destroyed a large barn, snapped trees, downed power lines, and hurled metal roofing hundreds of yards. As it moved east, it damaged a carport and a manufactured home, uprooted numerous trees, and destroyed another barn before causing significant roof damage to one more home and then dissipating near railroad tracks.						

=== November 22 event ===
List of confirmed tornadoes – Saturday, November 22, 2025
EF#	Location	County / parish	State	Start coord.	Time (UTC)	Path length	Max. width
EF1	N of Guthrie	Todd	KY	36.6745°N 87.1781°W	06:38–06:41	1.64 mi (2.64 km)	75 yd (69 m)
EF1	This tornado began north-northwest of Guthrie where several trees were snapped, then moved east across open fields and flipped a pivot irrigation system, destroyed a small outbuilding, damaged nearby structures, and snapped multiple power poles before lifting just west of the US 79/KY 848 intersection.						

=== November 24 event ===
List of confirmed tornadoes – Monday, November 24, 2025
EF#	Location	County / parish	State	Start coord.	Time (UTC)	Path length	Max. width
EF1	Cypress	Harris	TX	29.919°N 95.693°W	19:23–19:28	2.61 mi (4.20 km)	500 yd (460 m)
EF1	This tornado moved through the Riata Ranch area, initially producing mostly minor damage as it entered nearby neighborhoods. Damage consisted largely of downed tree limbs and light residential impacts, though a concentrated corridor of stronger winds caused roof damage where a small section of plywood decking was removed. The tornado then weakened as it tracked northeast and dissipated just south of US 290, with no further damage observed.						
EF2	Louetta to Klein	Harris	TX	30.003°N 95.559°W	19:41–19:48	3.83 mi (6.16 km)	400 yd (370 m)
EF2	This strong tornado moved northeast through several residential neighborhoods in Klein, producing a mostly weak damage along its path. Damage primarily included roof shingle loss, fencing damage, and scattered tree impacts across multiple subdivisions. A few locations experienced significant damage, where large sections of roof decking were removed from homes. The tornado weakened as it continued northeast and ultimately dissipated in an open field.						
EF0	E of Dacoma	Alfalfa	OK	36.6523°N 98.5034°W	20:45	0.1 mi (0.16 km)	20 yd (18 m)
EF0	A brief tornado was photographed. No damage was reported.						

=== November 25 event ===
List of confirmed tornadoes – Tuesday, November 25, 2025
EF#	Location	County / parish	State	Start coord.	Time (UTC)	Path length	Max. width
EF0	WNW of Learned	Hinds	MS	32.2298°N 90.631°W	07:58–08:01	1.75 mi (2.82 km)	100 yd (91 m)
EF0	This tornado downed or snapped several trees and caused minor vegetation damage.						
EF1	SW of Quinton Northern Graysville to Mount Olive	Jefferson	AL	33.6171°N 87.128°W	10:23–10:41	17.91 mi (28.82 km)	300 yd (270 m)
EF1	This tornado began north of SR 269 and uprooted or snapped numerous trees. The tornado destroyed a few outbuildings before eventually dissipating over I-65.						
EF0	SE of Morris to WNW of Bradford	Jefferson	AL	33.7185°N 86.7728°W	10:44–10:48	4.21 mi (6.78 km)	150 yd (140 m)
EF0	Several trees were snapped or uprooted.						

== December ==
Confirmed tornadoes by Enhanced Fujita rating
EFU	EF0	EF1	EF2	EF3	EF4	EF5	Total
1	7	6	1	0	0	0	15

=== December 18 event ===
List of confirmed tornadoes – Thursday, December 18, 2025
EF#	Location	County / parish	State	Start coord.	Time (UTC)	Path length	Max. width
EF0	NE of Buffalo	LaRue	KY	37.5267°N 85.6796°W	01:05–01:08	1.98 mi (3.19 km)	20 yd (18 m)
EF0	This weak tornado caused damage southeast of Hodgenville near KY 210. The first damage included a barn that was destroyed, with debris scattered mainly to the east and southeast. Just south of KY 210, another barn lost roof panels that were lofted upward and carried across the highway. After crossing KY 210, several nearby structures sustained lighter damage, including roof and shingle loss and minor tree damage. The tornado continued eastward, causing additional tree damage before dissipating.						

=== December 25 event ===
List of confirmed tornadoes – Thursday, December 25, 2025
EF#	Location	County / parish	State	Start coord.	Time (UTC)	Path length	Max. width
EF0	Los Angeles	Los Angeles	CA	34.0257°N 118.2005°W	18:10–18:12	0.3 mi (0.48 km)	30 yd (27 m)
EF0	This tornado caused damage in the Boyle Heights neighborhood in Los Angeles. It first impacted a residence, where roof surfaces and structural elements were damaged enough to allow water intrusion and result in a localized power outage. The damage then continued northward into a commercial area, where multiple business signs were destroyed, and plastic and metal debris were blown across the area, breaking some windows. A utility pole was bent, street lighting infrastructure was damaged, and moderate-sized tree branches were snapped. The damage path ended just beyond the shopping area, where additional roof damage to nearby residences and damage to metal chain-link fencing were observed.						

=== December 28 event ===
List of confirmed tornadoes – Sunday, December 28, 2025
EF#	Location	County / parish	State	Start coord.	Time (UTC)	Path length	Max. width
EF1	S of Groveland	Tazewell	IL	40.5507°N 89.5554°W	15:27–15:32	1.72 mi (2.77 km)	200 yd (180 m)
EF1	Two outbuildings were destroyed, and one house near the end of the path suffered minor roof damage. Eight power poles and numerous trees were also snapped.						
EF1	Pontiac	Livingston	IL	40.8879°N 88.656°W	20:52–20:53	0.95 mi (1.53 km)	125 yd (114 m)
EF1	A tornado touched down on the northwest side of Pontiac and moved northeast through residential areas, where numerous houses, apartments, and manufactured homes sustained roofing and siding damage, including two homes that had large portions of their roofs blown off and attics exposed. As it continued northeast, it crossed IL 23, where additional manufactured homes experienced siding and fascia damage while several trees were also damaged along the path. The tornado dissipated shortly after exiting the north side of the city.						
EF2	NW of Blue Mound to Northern Mount Zion to NNW of LaPlace	Christian, Macon, Piatt	IL	39.7144°N 89.1421°W	20:59–21:33	22.36 mi (35.98 km)	250 yd (230 m)
EF2	A strong tornado first touched down in a field near Blue Mound with little initial damage before moving east-northeast into Macon County, where it remained weak until crossing US 51. As it reached the area between Elwin and Turpin, it intensified, damaging several homes and snapping numerous large trees. The tornado then moved into the northside of Mount Zion where it produced its most significant damage. Multiple homes had roofs completely stripped off, a garage was destroyed and thrown into a nearby block, and very large trees were knocked down. Continuing east-northeast, the tornado caused additional roof and tree damage before weakening as it moved through rural areas, where it mainly snapped tree branches and caused minor shingle damage to homes. The tornado then crossed into Piatt County and continued eastward before dissipating near IL 32.						
EF1	ESE of Saybrook to SW of Derby	McLean	IL	40.4168°N 88.4778°W	21:24–21:25	0.86 mi (1.38 km)	30 yd (27 m)
EF1	A large outbuilding was completely destroyed.						
EF0	S of Gibson City	Ford	IL	40.4405°N 88.3809°W	21:31–21:32	0.85 mi (1.37 km)	20 yd (18 m)
EF0	The metal roof of an office building was slightly peeled off the structure and tossed.						
EF0	W of Clifton	Iroquois	IL	40.9244°N 88.0522°W	21:31–21:34	2.6 mi (4.2 km)	100 yd (91 m)
EF0	This tornado snapped three utility poles as it touched down and moved northeast. It then damaged a nearby home by peeling off roofing material while also damaging trees. As it progressed, it struck a farm where two outbuildings had portions of their roofs torn off and additional trees were damaged. The tornado then lifted shortly afterward before causing any further damage.						
EF1	E of Clifton to SW of St. Anne	Iroquois	IL	40.9388°N 87.9033°W	21:40–21:51	9.5 mi (15.3 km)	150 yd (140 m)
EF1	A tornado touched down east of I-57 and initially produced little damage while moving over open fields. The tornado then strengthened as it tracked northeast and tore a large portion of roofing from a house, throwing it into a nearby field while snapping and tossing the top of a pine tree nearly 100 yards (91 m) and shifting a barn off its foundation with part of its roof removed. As it reached the Iroquois River, it intensified further, tearing the roof off a garage, peeling roofing from a nearby home, and causing extensive tree damage with multiple trees uprooted and many others losing large limbs. Continuing east, the tornado weakened slightly but still caused additional tree damage and impacted a residence and two barns before tipping over an irrigation pivot and dissipating near the Iroquois-Kankakee county line.						
EF0	SSE of Chebanse to S of Sugar Island	Iroquois	IL	40.9693°N 87.8889°W	21:41–21:46	3.4 mi (5.5 km)	75 yd (69 m)
EF0	A high-end EF0 tornado touched down near Langan Creek, where it caused minor tree damage before moving across open fields with little additional impact on either side of US 45. As it continued northeast, it intensified slightly and peeled shingles from a house while damaging multiple farm outbuildings, including a barn that was blown off its foundation and a garage that collapsed completely. As the tornado approached the Iroquois River, it weakened and dissipated.						
EFU	S of Martinton	Iroquois	IL	40.8964°N 87.7661°W	21:53-21:59	4.9 mi (7.9 km)	25 yd (23 m)
EFU	A tornado was observed by storm chasers as it remained over open fields. No damage occurred.						
EF0	SE of Redmon	Edgar	IL	39.6343°N 87.8445°W	22:45–22:46	0.2 mi (0.32 km)	30 yd (27 m)
EF0	Minor damage occurred to an outbuilding.						
EF1	Linton	Greene	IN	39.032°N 87.173°W	00:18–00:22	1.12 mi (1.80 km)	75 yd (69 m)
EF1	This tornado began in downtown Linton, where it quickly intensified and caused its strongest damage by tearing sections of roofing from masonry buildings. As it moved east-northeast through the downtown area, additional buildings sustained roof damage while trees were also damaged along the path. Continuing farther east, the tornado produced more scattered roof and tree damage before weakening and dissipating. One person was injured.						
EF1	ENE of Cynthia to Haubstadt	Gibson	IN	38.1974°N 87.6567°W	00:36–00:41	4.46 mi (7.18 km)	50 yd (46 m)
EF1	A narrow tornado damaged several barns. A section of one barn was destroyed, and another barn lost most of its roof. Several homes lost shingles. Power poles and trees were damaged.						
EF0	NNW of Central	Harrison	IN	38.1218°N 86.1779°W	02:22–02:23	0.12 mi (0.19 km)	60 yd (55 m)
EF0	A brief tornado lifted and rolled a storage shed, threw a livestock barn, and downed trees.						

== See also ==
- Tornadoes of 2025
- List of United States tornadoes from June to July 2025
- List of United States tornadoes from January to March 2026
