= Goodrich Public School District 16 =

School district in North Dakota, United States

Address
- 211 4th Street Goodrich, North Dakota, 58444; United States

District information
- Type: Public
- Grades: PreK–6
- NCES District ID: 3807950

Students and staff
- Students: 15
- Teachers: 3.0
- Staff: 7.05
- Student–teacher ratio: 5.0

Other information
- Website: www.goodrich.k12.nd.us

Goodrich Public School District 16 is a school district headquartered in Goodrich, North Dakota. It is in Sheridan County and serves Goodrich and Denhoff.

It serves elementary grades only.

== History ==
The school opened circa 1919.

In 1964 voters rejected two proposals. They voted 91–189 in regards to increasing the debt and 98–206 in regards to a $95,000 bond.

Goodrich previously served grades K-12. Prior to 2007 there was a proposal for this district to merge with the McClusky School District. In 2007 Goodrich voters rejected the consolidation measure with 43 voters in favor and 102 voters against. McClusky voters approved the consolidation as 200 voted in favor and 46 voted against. As a result, the Goodrich district administration considered becoming a non-operating district that would send students elsewhere. An editorial of The Bismarck Tribune suggested that the size disparity of the districts contributed to the decision by Goodrich voters.

In January 2020 the Goodrich School had 20 students. That year, effective the fall, Goodrich closed its secondary school and began sending secondary students to McClusky. This is due to lower enrollment figures. The district kept the elementary school open due to the 18 miles (29 km) distance to McClusky.

== Operations ==
People living in the district may choose other public schools at no charge. The school district gives bus transportation for students to McClusky High School but not to other secondary schools.
