= Winter House (Goodrich, North Dakota) =

Historic house in North Dakota, United States

- Formerly listed on the U.S. National Register of Historic Places
- Location within North Dakota Location within the United States
- Nearest city: Goodrich, North Dakota
- Coordinates: 47°38′12″N 100°05′01″W
- Area: less than one acre
- Built: 1900
- Built by: Daniel Winter
- Architectural style: Vernacular Russian-German
- NRHP reference No.: 79001775
- Removed from NRHP: April 1, 2009

The Winter House near Goodrich, North Dakota was built in 1900. It built in vernacular Russian-German style by Daniel Winter. It was listed on the National Register of Historic Places but was delisted in 2009.

Delisting usually means that a building was demolished or otherwise lost its historic integrity.

Built by immigrant Daniel Winter, it is significant as a surviving example of what is termed "puddled clay" construction, brought from Russia.
