= Goodrich, North Dakota =

- City
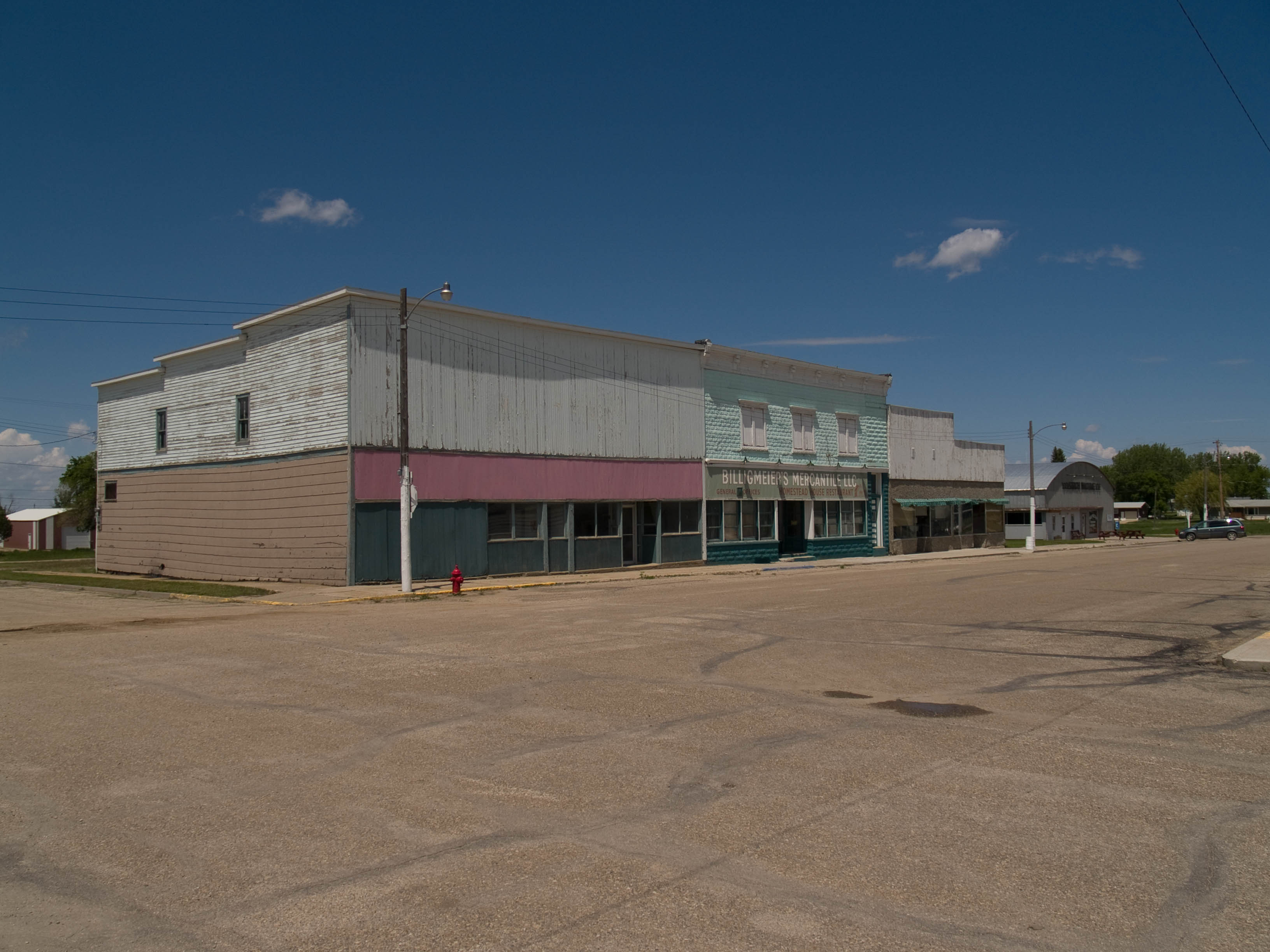
- Business District of Goodrich

- Location of Goodrich, North Dakota
- Coordinates: 47°28′33″N 100°07′29″W
- Country: United States
- State: North Dakota
- County: Sheridan
- Founded: 1901

Area
  - Total: 0.29 sq mi (0.76 km^{2})
  - Land: 0.29 sq mi (0.76 km^{2})
  - Water: 0.0039 sq mi (0.01 km^{2})
- Elevation: 1,978 ft (603 m)

Population (2020)
  - Total: 106
  - Estimate (2022): 112
  - Density: 363.3/sq mi (140.28/km^{2})
- Time zone: UTC-6 (Central (CST))
  - Summer (DST): UTC-5 (CDT)
- ZIP code: 58444
- Area code: 701
- FIPS code: 38-31500
- GNIS feature ID: 1036061

Goodrich is a city in Sheridan County, North Dakota, United States. The population was 106 at the 2020 census. Goodrich was founded in 1901.

== Geography ==
According to the United States Census Bureau, the city has a total area of 0.28 square miles (0.73 km^{2}), all land.

Goodrich is located 13 miles east of McClusky and 11 miles west of Hurdsfield.

== Demographics ==
Historical population
Census	Pop.	Note	%±
1910	410		—
1920	476		16.1%
1930	468		−1.7%
1940	476		1.7%
1950	448		−5.9%
1960	392		−12.5%
1970	300		−23.5%
1980	288		−4.0%
1990	192		−33.3%
2000	163		−15.1%
2010	98		−39.9%
2020	106		8.2%
2022 (est.)	112		5.7%
U.S. Decennial Census; 2020 Census

=== 2010 census ===
As of the census of 2010, there were 98 people, 57 households, and 29 families residing in the city. The population density was 350.0 inhabitants per square mile (135.1/km^{2}). There were 107 housing units at an average density of 382.1 per square mile (147.5/km^{2}). The racial makeup of the city was 98.0% White and 2.0% Native American.

There were 57 households, of which 14.0% had children under the age of 18 living with them, 36.8% were married couples living together, 7.0% had a female householder with no husband present, 7.0% had a male householder with no wife present, and 49.1% were non-families. 47.4% of all households were made up of individuals, and 31.6% had someone living alone who was 65 years of age or older. The average household size was 1.72 and the average family size was 2.38.

The median age in the city was 57 years. 10.2% of residents were under the age of 18; 4% were between the ages of 18 and 24; 17.4% were from 25 to 44; 32.6% were from 45 to 64; and 35.7% were 65 years of age or older. The gender makeup of the city was 46.9% male and 53.1% female.

=== 2000 census ===
As of the census of 2000, there were 163 people, 81 households, and 45 families residing in the city. The population density was 582.8 inhabitants per square mile (225.0/km^{2}). There were 113 housing units at an average density of 404.1 per square mile (156.0/km^{2}). The racial makeup of the city was 99.39% White and 0.61% African American.

There were 81 households, out of which 18.5% had children under the age of 18 living with them, 46.9% were married couples living together, 4.9% had a female householder with no husband present, and 44.4% were non-families. 39.5% of all households were made up of individuals, and 25.9% had someone living alone who was 65 years of age or older. The average household size was 2.01 and the average family size was 2.69.

In the city, the population was spread out, with 19.0% under the age of 18, 2.5% from 18 to 24, 14.7% from 25 to 44, 25.8% from 45 to 64, and 38.0% who were 65 years of age or older. The median age was 52 years. For every 100 females, there were 96.4 males. For every 100 females age 18 and over, there were 85.9 males.

The median income for a household in the city was $23,500, and the median income for a family was $28,125. Males had a median income of $20,000 versus $17,500 for females. The per capita income for the city was $14,520. About 15.1% of families and 14.0% of the population were below the poverty line, including 12.9% of those under the age of eighteen and 18.6% of those 65 or over.

== Education ==
It is zoned to Goodrich Public School District 16. In 2020 the Goodrich district closed its high school and began sending high school students to McClusky School District.

== Notable person ==
- John E. Davis, 25th governor of North Dakota

== See also ==
- Clark House (Goodrich, North Dakota)
- Winter House (Goodrich, North Dakota)
