= McClusky School District =

School district in North Dakota, USA

Address
- 219 Avenue D West McClusky, North Dakota, 58463; United States

District information
- Type: Public
- Grades: PreK–12
- NCES District ID: 3812430

Students and staff
- Students: 100
- Teachers: 18.09
- Staff: 10.11
- Student–teacher ratio: 5.53

Other information
- Website: www.mcclusky.k12.nd.us

McClusky Public School District 19 is a school district headquartered in McClusky, North Dakota. It is mostly in Sheridan County, but extends into Burleigh County. It operates McClusky Elementary School and McClusky High School.

Prior to 2007 there was a proposal for this district to merge with the Goodrich School District 16. In 2007 McClusky voters approved the consolidation as 200 voted in favor and 46 voted against, but the districts did not consolidate because Goodrich voters rejected the consolidation measure with 43 voters in favor and 102 voters against. In 2020 Goodrich closed its secondary school and began sending secondary students to McClusky. The Goodrich district kept the elementary school open due to the 18 miles (29 km) distance to McClusky. The Goodrich district serves Goodrich and Denhoff.
