= Clark House (Goodrich, North Dakota) =

Historic house in North Dakota, United States

- U.S. National Register of Historic Places
- Spence Family Mansion
- Location within North Dakota Location within the United States
- Location: 322 McKinley Ave., Goodrich, North Dakota
- Coordinates: 47°28′27″N 100°07′37″W
- Built: 1901
- Architectural style: Late 19th and 20th Century Revivals, Colonial Revival
- NRHP reference No.: 13000453
- Added to NRHP: June 25, 2013

The Clark House in Goodrich, North Dakota is a historic house built in 1901 that was listed on the National Register of Historic Places in 2013.

It is significant as the first residence built in Goodrich, which was platted in 1901, and as "a good example of Colonial Revival architecture and the best example of that style remaining in Goodrich."

Its walls are built of pressed concrete blocks, and it has wood fishscale shingles beneath its eaves.
