= Denhoff, North Dakota =

Denhoff
- Census-designated place & unincorporated community
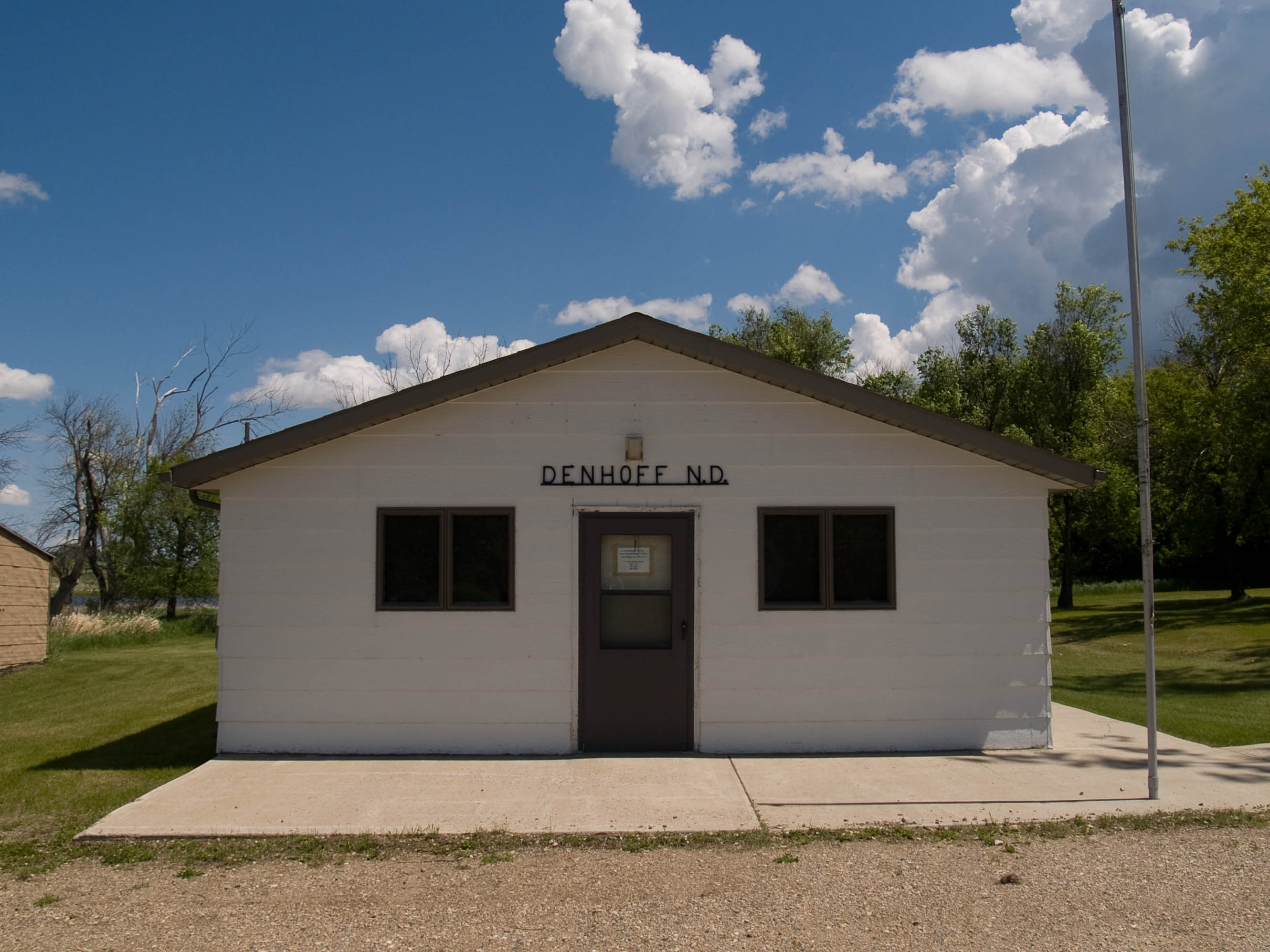
- Building in Denhoff

- Location within the state of North Dakota
- Coordinates: 47°28′47″N 100°15′44″W
- Country: United States
- State: North Dakota
- County: Sheridan

Area
  - Total: 0.66 sq mi (1.70 km^{2})
  - Land: 0.66 sq mi (1.70 km^{2})
  - Water: 0 sq mi (0.00 km^{2})
- Elevation: 2,044 ft (623 m)

Population (2020)
  - Total: 13
  - Density: 19.8/sq mi (7.63/km^{2})
- Time zone: UTC-6 (Central (CST))
  - Summer (DST): UTC-5 (CDT)
- ZIP codes: 58430
- Area code: 701
- FIPS code: 38-19060
- GNIS feature ID: 2584340

Denhoff (/ˈdɛnhɔːf/) is an unincorporated community and census-designated place in central Sheridan County, North Dakota, United States. The community was designated as part of the U.S. Census Bureau's Participant Statistical Areas Program on March 31, 2010. It was not counted separately during the 2000 Census, but was included in the 2010 Census. As of the 2020 census, Denhoff had a population of 13.

It lies along North Dakota Highway 200, east of the city of McClusky, the county seat of Sheridan County. The post office no longer exists. There are no businesses left in town, and a church remains. In 2009, a seed packaging plant began operations in Denhoff as well.

Historically, Denhoff functioned as a service town for the regional farming community, which began to decline after the 1960s. In the 1950s, its population reached its maximum of over 350 residents, and in addition to the post office and church, services consisted of a school, a gas station, and a bar. The expansion of corporately-managed large farms during the 1970s led to a major loss of population to unemployment in both Denhoff and the surrounding countryside, which in turn led to closure of most of the service operations and further loss of populace.

== Demographics ==
Historical population
Census	Pop.	Note	%±
2010	20		—
2020	13		−35.0%
U.S. Decennial Census

== Education ==
It is zoned to Goodrich Public School District 16. In 2020 the Goodrich district closed its high school and began sending high school students to McClusky School District.
