= Livona, North Dakota =

Unincorporated community in the United States

Coordinates: 46°30′08″N 100°32′49″W

Livona is an unincorporated community in Hazelton Township, Emmons County, North Dakota, United States. It is located on the T-intersection between 63rd Street SW and North Dakota State Highway 1804. Situated on the eastern shore of Lake Oahe, it is approximately 30 miles (48 km) south of Bismarck and 12.5 miles (20.1 km) west of Hazelton. It is at an elevation of 1,663 feet (507 m) and is just north of Badger Creek.
