= Lees Landing, Louisiana =

- Unincorporated community
- Location within Louisiana Location within the United States
- Coordinates: 30°24′16″N 90°19′25″W
- Country: United States
- State: Louisiana
- Parish: Tangipahoa
- Elevation: 3 ft (0.91 m)
- Time zone: UTC-6 (Central (CST))
  - Summer (DST): UTC-5 (CDT)
- Area code: 985
- GNIS feature ID: 555013
- FIPS code: 22-42975

Lees Landing is an unincorporated community in Tangipahoa Parish, Louisiana, United States. The community is located 7 miles (11.27 kilometres) SE of Ponchatoula, Louisiana.

== History ==
The first settlers to claim the area was Jean Batiste Denelle and his wife Elizabeth. The family sold the land to a logger named Alexander Lea. Timber from all over Tangipahoa parish was hauled down to the property to be exported to New Orleans, Louisiana. The surrounding communities began to call the area Lea’s Landing. Later USGS maps were updated and the modern name of Lees Landing was used to describe the area.
