= NFL Top 100 Players of 2026 =

Annual list of top NFL players

- Season 2026
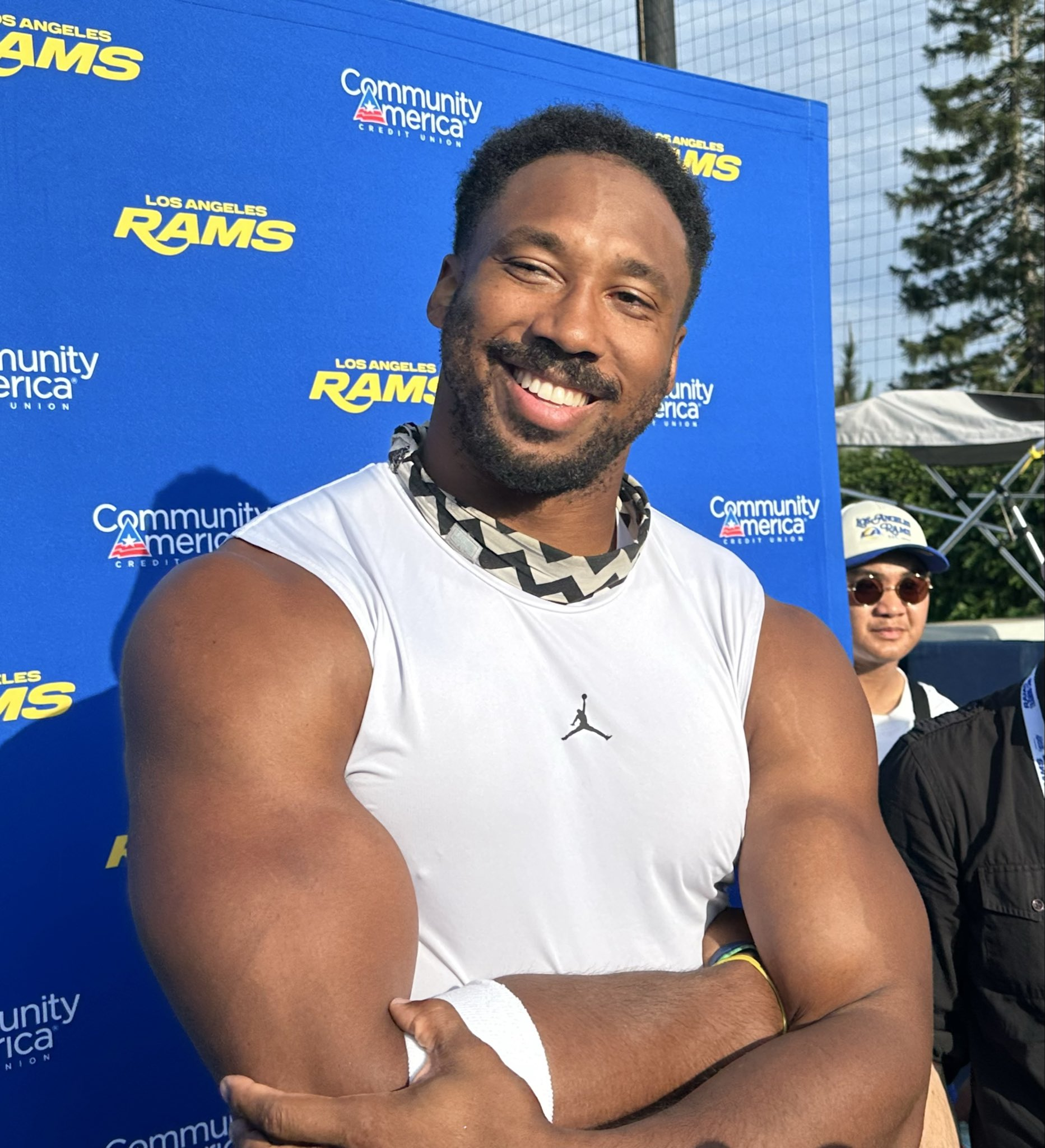
- Myles Garrett, the #1-ranked player

Release
- Original network: X Originals
- Original release: June 22 – September 3, 2026

Season chronology
- ← Previous; 2025 Next → 2027

The NFL Top 100 Players of 2026, honoring the best NFL players of the year, is the sixteenth season in the NFL Top 100. It premiered on June 22, 2026, and concluded on September 3, 2026. Los Angeles Rams defensive end Myles Garrett was ranked the top player of 2026, the first time in his career. The Washington Commanders were the only team to not have a player featured on the list.

== Episodes ==
No.	Air date	Network	Numbers
1	June 22 – June 26	X Originals	100–91
2	June 29 – July 3	X Originals	90–81
3	July 6 – 10	X Originals	80–71
4	July 13 – 17	X Originals	70–61
5	July 20 – July 24	X Originals	60–51
6	July 27 – 31	X Originals	50–41
7	August 3 – 7	X Originals	40–31
8	August 10 – 14	X Originals	30–21
9	August 17 – 21	X Originals	20–11
10	August 24 – September 3	X Originals	10–1

== Top 100 Players ==
Rank	Player	Position	2025 team	2026 team	Rank change	Reference	Year's accomplishments
1	Myles Garrett	Defensive end	Cleveland Browns	Los Angeles Rams	▲7		NFL Defensive Player of the Year (2025); First-team All-Pro (2025); Selected to 7th Pro Bowl (2025); 60 tackles; 23 sacks (league leader/NFL record); 33 tackles-for-loss (league leader); 3 forced fumbles
2	Josh Allen	Quarterback	Buffalo Bills		▲1		Selected to 4th Pro Bowl (2025); 3,668 passing yards; 25 passing touchdowns; 579 rushing yards; 14 rushing touchdowns
3	Bijan Robinson	Running back	Atlanta Falcons		▲59		First-team All-Pro (2025) (Note: Selected as a Running Back); Second-team All-Pro (2025) (Note: Selected as the all purpose); Selected to 2nd Pro Bowl (2025); 1,478 rushing yards; 7 rushing touchdowns; 79 receptions; 820 receiving yards; 4 receiving touchdowns
4	Matthew Stafford	Quarterback	Los Angeles Rams		▲55		NFL Most Valuable Player (2025); First-team All-Pro (2025); Selected to 3rd Pro Bowl (2025); 4,707 passing yards (league leader); 46 passing touchdowns (league leader)
5	Jaxon Smith-Njigba	Wide receiver	Seattle Seahawks		NR		Super Bowl champion (LX); NFL Offensive Player of the Year (2025); First-team All-Pro (2025); Selected to 2nd Pro Bowl (2025); 119 receptions; 1,793 receiving yards (league leader); 10 receiving touchdowns
6	Christian McCaffrey	Running back	San Francisco 49ers		▲67		NFL Comeback Player of the Year (2025); First-team All-Pro (2025) (Note: Selected as the all purpose); Selected to 4th Pro Bowl (2025); 1,202 rushing yards; 10 rushing touchdowns; 102 receptions; 924 receiving yards; 7 receiving touchdowns
7	Puka Nacua	Wide receiver	Los Angeles Rams		▲34		First-team All-Pro (2025); Selected to 2nd Pro Bowl (2025); 129 receptions (league leader); 1,715 receiving yards; 10 receiving touchdowns
8	Micah Parsons	Defensive end	Green Bay Packers		▲28		First-team All-Pro (2025); Selected to 5th Pro Bowl (2025); 41 tackles; 12.5 sacks; 12 tackles-for-loss; 2 forced fumbles; 1 pass defended
9	Jahmyr Gibbs	Running back	Detroit Lions		▲18		Selected to 3rd Pro Bowl (2025); 1,223 rushing yards; 13 rushing touchdowns; 77 receptions; 616 receiving yards; 5 receiving touchdowns
10	Patrick Surtain II	Cornerback	Denver Broncos		0		Second-team All-Pro (2025); Selected to 4th Pro Bowl (2025); 47 tackles; 12 passes defended; 1 interception; 1 tackle-for-loss
11	Drake Maye	Quarterback	New England Patriots		NR		Second-team All-Pro (2025); Selected to 2nd Pro Bowl (2025); 4,394 passing yards; 31 passing touchdowns; 450 rushing yards; 4 rushing touchdowns
12	Will Anderson Jr.	Defensive end	Houston Texans		▲34		First-team All-Pro (2025); Selected to 2nd Pro Bowl (2025); 54 tackles; 20 tackles for loss; 12 sacks; 3 forced fumbles; 2 fumble recoveries; 3 passes defended
13	Trey McBride	Tight end	Arizona Cardinals		▲42		First-team All-Pro (2025); Selected to 2nd Pro Bowl (2025); 126 receptions; 1,239 receiving yards; 11 receiving touchdowns
14	Brian Burns	Linebacker	New York Giants		NR		Second-team All-Pro (2025); Selected to 3rd Pro Bowl (2025); 67 tackles; 16.5 sacks; 7 passes defended; 3 forced fumbles; 1 fumble recovery
15	Derrick Henry	Running back	Baltimore Ravens		▼8		1,595 rushing yards; 16 rushing touchdowns; 15 receptions; 150 receiving yards
16	Ja'Marr Chase	Wide receiver	Cincinnati Bengals		▼12		First-team All-Pro (2025); Selected to 5th Pro Bowl (2025); 125 receptions; 1,412 receiving yards; 8 receiving touchdowns
17	Jonathan Taylor	Running back	Indianapolis Colts		NR		Selected to 3rd Pro Bowl (2025); 1,585 rushing yards; 18 rushing touchdowns (league leader); 46 receptions; 378 receiving yards; 2 receiving touchdowns
18	Patrick Mahomes	Quarterback	Kansas City Chiefs		▼13		3,587 passing yards; 22 passing touchdowns; 422 rushing yards; 5 rushing touchdowns
19	Justin Jefferson	Wide receiver	Minnesota Vikings		▼10		84 receptions; 1,048 receiving yards; 2 receiving touchdowns
20	James Cook	Running back	Buffalo Bills		▲69		Second-team All-Pro (2025); Selected to 3rd Pro Bowl (2025); 1,621 rushing yards (league leader); 12 rushing touchdowns; 33 receptions; 291 receiving yards; 2 receiving touchdowns
21	Sam Darnold	Quarterback	Seattle Seahawks		▲51		Super Bowl champion (LX); Selected to 2nd Pro Bowl (2025); 4,048 passing yards; 25 passing touchdowns; 95 rushing yards
22	Amon-Ra St. Brown	Wide receiver	Detroit Lions		▼2		Second-team All-Pro (2025); Selected to 4th Pro Bowl (2025); 117 receptions; 1,401 receiving yards; 11 receiving touchdowns
23	Danielle Hunter	Defensive end	Houston Texans		▲2		Second-team All-Pro (2025); 54 tackles; 15.0 sacks; 15 tackles-for-loss; 3 passes defended; 3 forced fumbles; 1 fumble recovery
24	Maxx Crosby	Defensive end	Las Vegas Raiders		▼2		Selected to 5th Pro Bowl (2025); 73 tackles; 10.0 sacks; 28 tackles-for-loss; 1 interception; 6 passes defended; 2 forced fumbles
25	Derek Stingley Jr.	Cornerback	Houston Texans		▼7		Selected to 2nd Pro Bowl (2025); First-team All-Pro (2025); 36 tackles; 1 tackle-for-loss; 15 passes defended; 4 interceptions; 1 touchdown; 1 forced fumble
26	De'Von Achane	Running back	Miami Dolphins		NR		Selected to 1st Pro Bowl (2025); 1,350 rushing yards; 8 rushing touchdowns; 67 receptions; 488 receiving yards; 4 receiving touchdowns
27	Devin Lloyd	Linebacker	Jacksonville Jaguars	Carolina Panthers	NR		Second-team All-Pro (2025); Selected to 1st Pro Bowl (2025); 81 tackles; 6 tackles-for-loss; 1.5 sacks; 7 passes defended; 5 interceptions; 1 touchdown; 1 fumble recovery
28	Christian Gonzalez	Cornerback	New England Patriots		▲56		Selected to 1st Pro Bowl (2025); 69 tackles; 1 tackle-for-loss; 10 passes defended
29	Jalen Carter	Defensive tackle	Philadelphia Eagles		▲14		Selected to 2nd Pro Bowl (2025); 33 total tackles; 3 sacks; 5 tackles-for-loss; 7 passes defended
30	Aidan Hutchinson	Defensive end	Detroit Lions		▲25		Second-team All-Pro (2025); Selected to 2nd Pro Bowl (2025); 54 total tackles; 14.5 sacks; 14 tackles-for-loss; 4 forced fumbles; 1 fumble recovery; 3 passes defended; 1 interception
31	Dak Prescott	Quarterback	Dallas Cowboys		▲48		Selected to 4th Pro Bowl (2025); 4,552 passing yards; 30 passing touchdowns; 177 rushing yards; 2 rushing touchdowns
32	Nik Bonitto	Linebacker	Denver Broncos		▲6		Selected to 2nd Pro Bowl (2025); 46 tackles; 14 sacks; 14 tackles-for-loss; 2 forced fumbles; 1 pass defended
33	Jared Goff	Quarterback	Detroit Lions		▼18		Selected to 5th Pro Bowl (2025); 4,564 passing yards; 34 passing touchdowns; 45 rushing yards
34	Saquon Barkley	Running back	Philadelphia Eagles		▼33		1,140 rushing yards; 7 rushing touchdowns; 37 receptions; 273 receiving yards; 2 receiving touchdowns
35	Jared Verse	Defensive end	Los Angeles Rams	Cleveland Browns	▲18		Selected to 2nd Pro Bowl (2025); 35 tackles; 7.5 sacks; 11 tackles-for-loss; 1 pass defended; 3 forced fumbles
36	George Pickens	Wide receiver	Dallas Cowboys		NR		Second-team All-Pro (2025); Selected to 1st Pro Bowl (2025); 93 receptions; 1,429 receiving yards; 9 receiving touchdowns
37	Penei Sewell	Offensive tackle	Detroit Lions		▼24		First-team All-Pro (2025); Selected to 4th Pro Bowl (2025); 998 snaps played; 19 pressures allowed; 2 sacks allowed
38	Cooper DeJean	Cornerback	Philadelphia Eagles		▲22		First-team All-Pro (2025) (Note: Selected as slot cornerback); Selected to 1st Pro Bowl (2025); 93 tackles; 4 tackles-for-loss; 16 passes defended; 2 interceptions; 1 forced fumble
39	Justin Herbert	Quarterback	Los Angeles Chargers		▲17		Selected to 2nd Pro Bowl (2025); 3,727 passing yards; 26 passing touchdowns; 498 rushing yards; 2 rushing touchdowns
40	Trent Williams	Offensive tackle	San Francisco 49ers		▲5		Second-team All-Pro (2025); Selected to 12th Pro Bowl (2025); 996 snaps played; 32 pressures allowed; 4 sacks allowed
41	T. J. Watt	Linebacker	Pittsburgh Steelers		▼30		Selected to 8th Pro Bowl (2025); 55 tackles; 7 sacks; 10 tackles-for-loss; 19 quarterback hits; 2 interceptions; 8 passes defended; 3 forced fumbles; 2 fumble recoveries
42	Garett Bolles	Offensive tackle	Denver Broncos		NR		First-team All-Pro (2025); Selected to 1st Pro Bowl (2025); NFLPA Alan Page Community Award (2026); 1,126 snaps played; 19 pressures allowed; 0 sacks allowed
43	Chris Jones	Defensive tackle	Kansas City Chiefs		▼31		Selected to 7th Pro Bowl (2025); 29 tackles; 7 sacks; 12 tackles-for-loss; 2 passes defended
44	Joe Burrow	Quarterback	Cincinnati Bengals		▼38		Selected to 3rd Pro Bowl (2025); George Halas Award (2025); 1,809 passing yards; 17 passing touchdowns; 41 rushing yards
45	Zack Baun	Linebacker	Philadelphia Eagles		▼19		Selected to 2nd Pro Bowl (2025); 123 tackles; 3.5 sacks; 7 tackles-for-loss; 1 forced fumble; 1 fumble recovery; 2 interceptions; 7 passes defended
46	George Kittle	Tight end	San Francisco 49ers		▼15		Selected to 7th Pro Bowl (2025); 57 receptions; 628 receiving yards; 7 receiving touchdowns
47	Quinyon Mitchell	Cornerback	Philadelphia Eagles		▲2		First-team All-Pro (2025); Selected to 1st Pro Bowl (2025); 45 total tackles; 17 passes defended; 1 fumble recovery
48	Josh Hines-Allen	Defensive end	Jacksonville Jaguars		▲17		49 total tackles; 8 sacks; 12 tackles-for-loss; 3 passes defended; 1 safety
49	Joe Thuney	Guard	Chicago Bears		NR		NFL Protector of the Year (2025); First-team All-Pro (2025); Selected to 4th Pro Bowl (2025); 1,149 snaps played; 15 pressures allowed; 0 sacks allowed
50	Derwin James	Safety	Los Angeles Chargers		▲4		Second-team All-Pro (2025); Selected to 5th Pro Bowl (2025); 94 total tackles; 2 sacks; 6 tackles-for-loss; 7 passes defended; 3 interceptions; 1 forced fumble
51	Caleb Williams	Quarterback	Chicago Bears		NR		3,942 passing yards; 27 passing touchdowns; 388 rushing yards; 3 rushing touchdowns
52	Tristan Wirfs	Offensive tackle	Tampa Bay Buccaneers		▼24		Selected to 5th Pro Bowl (2025); 778 snaps played; 23 pressures allowed; 2 sacks allowed; 1 receiving touchdown
53	Davante Adams	Wide receiver	Los Angeles Rams		NR		60 receptions; 789 receiving yards; 14 receiving touchdowns (league leader)
54	Fred Warner	Linebacker	San Francisco 49ers		▼38		51 total tackles; 2 tackles-for-loss; 3 passes defended; 2 forced fumbles; 1 fumble recovery
55	CeeDee Lamb	Wide receiver	Dallas Cowboys		▼20		Selected to 5th Pro Bowl (2025); 75 receptions; 1,077 receiving yards; 3 receiving touchdowns
56	Jalen Hurts	Quarterback	Philadelphia Eagles		▼37		Selected to 3rd Pro Bowl (2025); 3,224 passing yards; 25 passing touchdowns; 421 rushing yards; 8 rushing touchdowns
57	Dion Dawkins	Offensive tackle	Buffalo Bills		▼15		Selected to 5th Pro Bowl (2025); 957 snaps played; 33 pressures allowed; 6 sacks allowed
58	Nico Collins	Wide receiver	Houston Texans		▼26		Selected to 2nd Pro Bowl (2025); 71 receptions; 1,117 receiving yards; 6 receiving touchdowns
59	Bo Nix	Quarterback	Denver Broncos		▲5		3,931 passing yards; 25 passing touchdowns; 356 rushing yards; 5 rushing touchdowns
60	Brock Bowers	Tight end	Las Vegas Raiders		▼36		Selected to 2nd Pro Bowl (2025); 64 receptions; 680 receiving yards; 7 receiving touchdowns
61	Kevin Byard	Safety	Chicago Bears	New England Patriots	NR		First-team All-Pro (2025); Selected to 3rd Pro Bowl (2025); 93 tackles; 8 passes defended; 7 interceptions (league leader)
62	Trevor Lawrence	Quarterback	Jacksonville Jaguars		NR		4,007 passing yards; 29 passing touchdowns; 359 rushing yards; 9 rushing touchdowns
63	Kyle Hamilton	Safety	Baltimore Ravens		▼12		First-team All-Pro (2025); Selected to 3rd Pro Bowl (2025); 105 total tackles; 1 sack; 7 tackles-for-loss; 9 passes defended; 2 forced fumbles
64	Chris Olave	Wide receiver	New Orleans Saints		NR		Second-team All-Pro (2025); 100 receptions; 1,163 receiving yards; 9 receiving touchdowns
65	Roquan Smith	Linebacker	Baltimore Ravens		▼25		Selected to 4th Pro Bowl (2025); 130 total tackles; 5 tackles-for-loss; 3 passes defended; 1 fumble recovery; 1 defensive touchdown
66	Drake London	Wide receiver	Atlanta Falcons		▲31		68 receptions; 919 receiving yards; 7 receiving touchdowns
67	Jordyn Brooks	Linebacker	Miami Dolphins		NR		First-team All-Pro (2025); 183 total tackles; 3.5 sacks; 13 tackles-for-loss; 3 passes defended; 1 forced fumble; 1 fumble recovery
68	Courtland Sutton	Wide receiver	Denver Broncos		NR		Selected to 2nd Pro Bowl (2025); 74 receptions; 1,017 receiving yards; 7 receiving touchdowns
69	Lamar Jackson	Quarterback	Baltimore Ravens		▼67		2,549 passing yards; 21 passing touchdowns; 349 rushing yards; 2 rushing touchdowns
70	Xavier McKinney	Safety	Green Bay Packers		▼40		Second-team All-Pro (2025); 107 total tackles; 1 sack; 10 passes defended; 2 interceptions; 1 forced fumble
71	Zay Flowers	Wide receiver	Baltimore Ravens		NR		Selected to 2nd Pro Bowl (2025); 86 receptions; 1,211 receiving yards; 5 receiving touchdowns
72	Jordan Love	Quarterback	Green Bay Packers		▼4		3,381 passing yards; 23 passing touchdowns; 199 rushing yards
73	Zach Allen	Defensive end	Denver Broncos		▲17		First-team All-Pro (2025); Selected to 1st Pro Bowl (2025); 38 tackles; 4 tackles-for-loss; 7 sacks; 47 quarterback hits; 6 passes defended
74	Josh Jacobs	Running back	Green Bay Packers		▼41		929 rushing yards; 13 rushing touchdowns; 282 receiving yards; 1 receiving touchdown
75	Budda Baker	Safety	Arizona Cardinals		▼41		Selected to 8th Pro Bowl (2025); 120 total tackles; 0.5 sack; 4 tackles-for-loss; 5 passes defended; 1 interception; 1 fumble recovery
76	Jaycee Horn	Cornerback	Carolina Panthers		NR		Selected to 2nd Pro Bowl (2025); 37 total tackles; 1 tackle-for-loss; 8 passes defended; 5 interceptions
77	Baker Mayfield	Quarterback	Tampa Bay Buccaneers		▼27		3,693 passing yards; 26 passing touchdowns; 382 rushing yards; 1 rushing touchdown
78	Josh Sweat	Linebacker	Arizona Cardinals		▲17		30 total tackles; 12 sacks; 13 tackles-for-loss; 2 passes defended; 4 forced fumbles; 1 fumble recovery
79	Travis Kelce	Tight end	Kansas City Chiefs		▼42		Selected to 11th Pro Bowl (2025); 76 receptions; 851 receiving yards; 5 receiving touchdowns
80	A. J. Brown	Wide receiver	Philadelphia Eagles	New England Patriots	▼51		78 receptions; 1,003 receiving yards; 7 receiving touchdowns
81	Bobby Wagner	Linebacker	Washington Commanders	Free Agent	▼7		Walter Payton NFL Man of the Year; 162 total tackles; 4.5 sacks; 8 tackles-for-loss; 4 passes defended; 2 interceptions
82	Jalen Ramsey	Safety	Pittsburgh Steelers		▼16		Selected to 8th Pro Bowl (2025); 88 total tackles; 3 sacks; 4 tackles-for-loss; 8 passes defended; 1 interception
83	Jeffery Simmons	Defensive tackle	Tennessee Titans	Tennessee Titans/Chicago Bears	NR		First-team All-Pro (2025); Selected to 4th Pro Bowl (2025); 67 total tackles; 11 sacks; 17 tackles-for-loss; 3 forced fumbles; 1 safety; 1 receiving touchdown
84	Byron Young	Linebacker	Los Angeles Rams		NR		Selected to 1st Pro Bowl (2025); 82 total tackles; 12 sacks; 12 tackles-for-loss; 1 forced fumble
85	Brock Purdy	Quarterback	San Francisco 49ers		NR		2,167 passing yards; 20 passing touchdowns; 147 rushing yards; 3 rushing touchdowns
86	Tuli Tuipulotu	Linebacker	Los Angeles Chargers		NR		Selected to 1st Pro Bowl (2025); 49 total tackles; 13 sacks; 20 tackles-for-loss; 3 passes defended; 2 forced fumbles; 1 fumble recovery
87	Tetairoa McMillan	Wide receiver	Carolina Panthers		NR		NFL Offensive Rookie of the Year (2025); PFWA All-Rookie Team (2025); 70 receptions; 1,014 receiving yards; 7 receiving touchdowns
88	Jack Campbell	Linebacker	Detroit Lions		NR		First-team All-Pro (2025); Selected to 1st Pro Bowl (2025); 176 total tackles; 5 sacks; 9 tackles-for-loss; 3 forced fumbles; 2 fumble recoveries
89	Kyren Williams	Running back	Los Angeles Rams		▼4		1,252 rushing yards; 10 rushing touchdowns; 281 receiving yards; 3 receiving touchdowns
90	Derrick Brown	Defensive end	Carolina Panthers		NR		73 tackles; 5 tackles-for-loss; 5 sacks; 1 forced fumble
91	Montez Sweat	Defensive end	Chicago Bears		NR		53 tackles; 13 tackles-for-loss; 10 sacks; 18 quarterback hits; 3 forced fumbles
92	Azeez Al-Shaair	Linebacker	Houston Texans		NR		103 tackles; 1 tackle-for-loss; 9 passes defended; 2 quarterback hits; 2 interceptions; 1 forced fumble; 1 fumble recovery
93	Carson Schwesinger	Linebacker	Cleveland Browns		NR		Defensive Rookie of the Year; PFWA All-Rookie Team (2025); 156 tackles; 11 tackles-for-loss; 2.5 sacks; 9 quarterback hits; 3 passes defended; 2 interceptions
94	Creed Humphrey	Center	Kansas City Chiefs		▼1		First-team All-Pro (2025); Selected to 4th Pro Bowl (2025); 1,093 snaps; 8 pressures allowed; 1 sack allowed
95	Demario Davis	Linebacker	New Orleans Saints	New York Jets	NR		143 tackles; 0.5 sacks; 3 passes defended; 2 forced fumbles; 1 fumble recovery; 6 tackles-for-loss
96	Travis Etienne	Running back	Jacksonville Jaguars	New Orleans Saints	NR		1,107 rushing yards; 7 rushing touchdowns; 292 receiving yards; 6 receiving touchdowns
97	Ernest Jones	Linebacker	Seattle Seahawks		NR		Super Bowl champion (LX); Second-team All-Pro (2025); 126 tackles; 4 tackles-for-loss; 0.5 sacks; 7 passes defended; 5 interceptions
98	Bryce Young	Quarterback	Carolina Panthers		NR		3,011 passing yards; 23 passing touchdowns; 216 rushing yards; 2 rushing touchdowns
99	Quenton Nelson	Guard	Indianapolis Colts	Indianapolis Colts/Seattle Seahawks	NR		Second-team All-Pro (2025); Selected to 8th Pro Bowl (2025); 1,039 snaps played; 15 pressures allowed; 1 sack allowed
100	Cameron Jordan	Defensive end	New Orleans Saints		NR		47 tackles; 15 tackles-for-loss; 10.5 sacks; 15 quarterback hits; 2 forced fumbles
