= Brysen Wright =

American football player (born 2010)

No. 1 – Mandarin Mustangs
- Position: Wide receiver

Personal information
- Born: August 21, 2010 (age 16)
- Listed height: 6 ft 3.5 in (1.92 m)
- Listed weight: 215 lb (98 kg)

Career information
- High school: Mandarin (Jacksonville, Florida)
- College: Miami (FL) (commit)

Brysen Wright (born August 21, 2010) is an American football wide receiver at Mandarin High School in Jacksonville, Florida. He is one of the top recruits in the class of 2027.

== Early life ==
Wright grew up playing football and basketball. He attended Crookshank Elementary School and R.J. Murray Middle School in St. Augustine, Florida.

Wright enrolled at Mandarin High School in Jacksonville, Florida. In his freshman debut, he caught two touchdowns in a 57–13 win over Creekside High School. Wright finished his first season with 31 receptions for 646 yards and eight touchdowns, helping Mandarin win the district title. He was named MVP of the FBU Freshman All-American Bowl after catching three passes for 66 yards and the game-winning touchdown. That summer, Wright played for Raw Miami in OT7, an offseason seven-on-seven league. He was one of the top performers in the OT7 Finals, where he "dominat[ed] blue-chippers two years his senior", recording a notable one-handed catch.

As a sophomore, Wright posted 46 receptions for 983 yards and 10 touchdowns in the regular season, despite being double covered in most games. He also recorded 63 tackles, five interceptions, and three touchdowns on defense, as well as two punt return touchdowns. Wright earned first-team All-First Coast honors from The Florida Times-Union. That offseason, he joined C1N in OT7 competition. He made a viral one-handed catch at the 2026 OT7 Finals.

=== Flag football ===
The summer before starting high school, Wright played flag football for the Jacksonville Jaguars-affiliated Jaguars Elite team at the 2024 NFL FLAG Championships, helping them reach the quarterfinals in their age division. He made two one-handed interceptions during a nationally televised game, both of which went viral on social media after the NFL posted the clips.

Wright helped the Jaguars Elite win the 14U title at the 2025 NFL FLAG Championships, earning 14U MVP honors after leading the competition with 10 touchdown receptions in seven games. He increased his profile by going viral for one particular one-handed touchdown catch, receiving comparisons to Odell Beckham Jr.'s famous catch after the clip was reposted by Patrick Mahomes, Chad Johnson, and Bijan Robinson. Beckham subsequently reached out to Wright to praise him for the catch. Additionally, the highlight was the SportsCenter Top 10 play of the day.

In January 2026, Wright was named the NFL Flag Player of the Year. He was officially recognized the following month at the 15th NFL Honors in San Francisco.

=== Recruiting ===
A five-star recruit, Wright was rated as the consensus number one overall wide receiver in the 2028 class prior to his reclassification. He received his first college offer from Miami in December 2023, when he was in the eighth grade. Wright received additional offers from Georgia and Florida State before he started high school. By the start of his sophomore season, Wright had received over 30 offers.

In August 2025, Wright was named the top prospect in the initial Rivals.com 2028 class rankings. Steve Wiltfong wrote that he "already looks like he could be a difference-maker for one of college football’s top programs with three years of high school eligibility to go." Similarly, Rivals director of scouting and rankings Charles Power wrote that Wright had a "readymade build that would not look out of place on a college football field as a fifteen-year-old." Upon the release of the first full Rivals300 2028 class rankings in March 2026, he was named the No. 3 prospect. Wright was named the top prospect in the class by ESPN upon the initial release of the SC Next Junior 300 in May, touting him as possessing "Julio Jones-type qualities". Ahead of his junior season, he was named the second-best recruit in the country regardless of class (behind Jalen Brewster) by ESPN recruiting coordinator Billy Tucker.

On November 1, 2026, Wright narrowed his top choices down to Florida, Miami, and Texas. Four days later, he verbally committed to playing college football for the Miami Hurricanes while announcing that he would be reclassifying to the class of 2027 and planned to enroll early at Miami in January 2027.

== Personal life ==
His father, Colby, has worked as a teacher and coach while his older brother, Myles, plays college football at West Florida. "I definitely learned a lot of stuff from my brother," said Wright. "He’s under-looked. He don’t have the size like me but I learned my route running from him. I learned my releases from him." According to his father, Wright received the nickname "B-Fye" after he scored five touchdowns on five touches in an 8U game.

In July 2025, Wright signed a Name, image and likeness (NIL) deal with trading card company Wild Card, becoming their first-ever high school signee.
