= 15th NFL Honors =

2026 American football awards ceremony

- Date: February 5, 2026
- Site: Palace of Fine Arts (San Francisco, California)
- Hosted by: Jon Hamm

Television coverage
- Network: NBC; Peacock; NFL Network; NFL+
- Duration: 2 hours

The 15th NFL Honors was an awards ceremony presented by the National Football League that honored players, coaches, and moments from the 2025 NFL season. Hosted by Jon Hamm, the ceremony took place on February 5, 2026, at the Palace of Fine Arts in San Francisco, California, and was broadcast on NBC and NFL Network with streaming on Peacock and NFL+.

Matthew Stafford of the Los Angeles Rams secured his first career Most Valuable Player award after leading the league with 4,707 passing yards and 46 touchdowns. Stafford edged out the New England Patriots' Drake Maye in the closest MVP vote since 2003. The Seattle Seahawks' Jaxon Smith-Njigba was named Offensive Player of the Year after leading the NFL with 1,793 receiving yards, becoming the second Seahawk to win the honor following Shaun Alexander in 2005. Myles Garrett of the Cleveland Browns was named Defensive Player of the Year unanimously, joining J. J. Watt, who is the only other player to achieve this feat. This marked Garrett's second career win and was recognized by a historic 2025 campaign in which he set a new single-season sack record with 23. For leading the league in sacks during the season, Garrett was also the recipient of the Deacon Jones Award.

Rookie honors went to Tetairoa McMillan of the Carolina Panthers and Carson Schwesinger of the Browns, who won Offensive and Defensive Rookie of the Year, respectively. McMillan led all rookies with 1,014 receiving yards and 7 touchdowns, while Schwesinger topped the rookie class with 146 total tackles and 11 tackles for loss. The inaugural Protector of the Year award, recognizing the league's top offensive lineman, was presented to Joe Thuney of the Chicago Bears. The top non-player award, Coach of the Year, went to Mike Vrabel, the head coach of the Patriots. In his debut season with the team, Vrabel orchestrated a historic turnaround, leading New England to a 14–3 record following back-to-back 4–13 finishes. He became the first head coach to inherit a 13-loss team and win at least 13 games in his first year. This was Vrabel's second Coach of the Year win, having previously won in 2021 with the Tennessee Titans. The ceremony also featured the unveiling of the 2026 Pro Football Hall of Fame class: Drew Brees, Roger Craig, Larry Fitzgerald, Luke Kuechly, and Adam Vinatieri. In late January 2026, ESPN reported that former Patriots head coach Bill Belichick would not be elected as a first-ballot Hall of Famer. As a result, the voters received criticism due to Belichick's coaching resume, including leading the Patriots to six Super Bowl victories while winning an additional two as an assistant coach.

== List of award winners ==
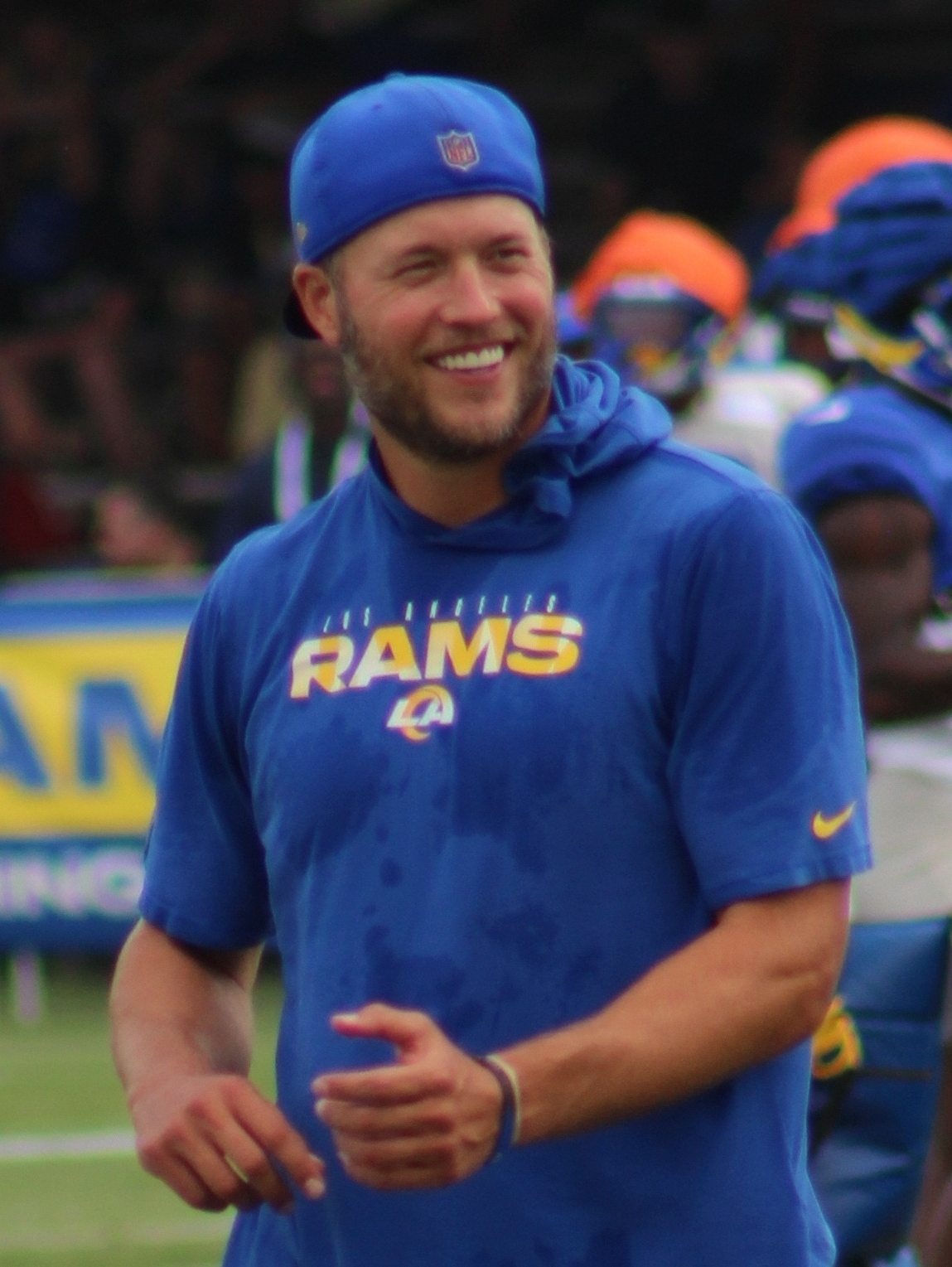
Matthew Stafford was named the Most Valuable Player.

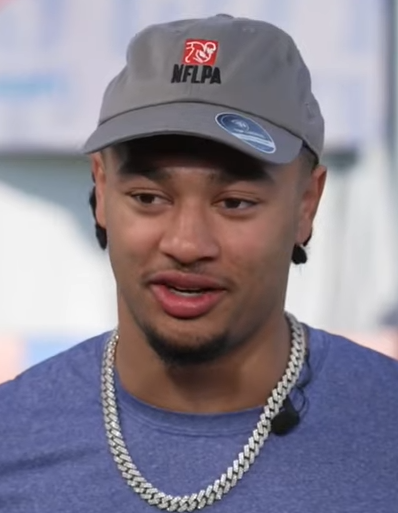
Jaxon Smith-Njigba was named the Offensive Player of the Year.

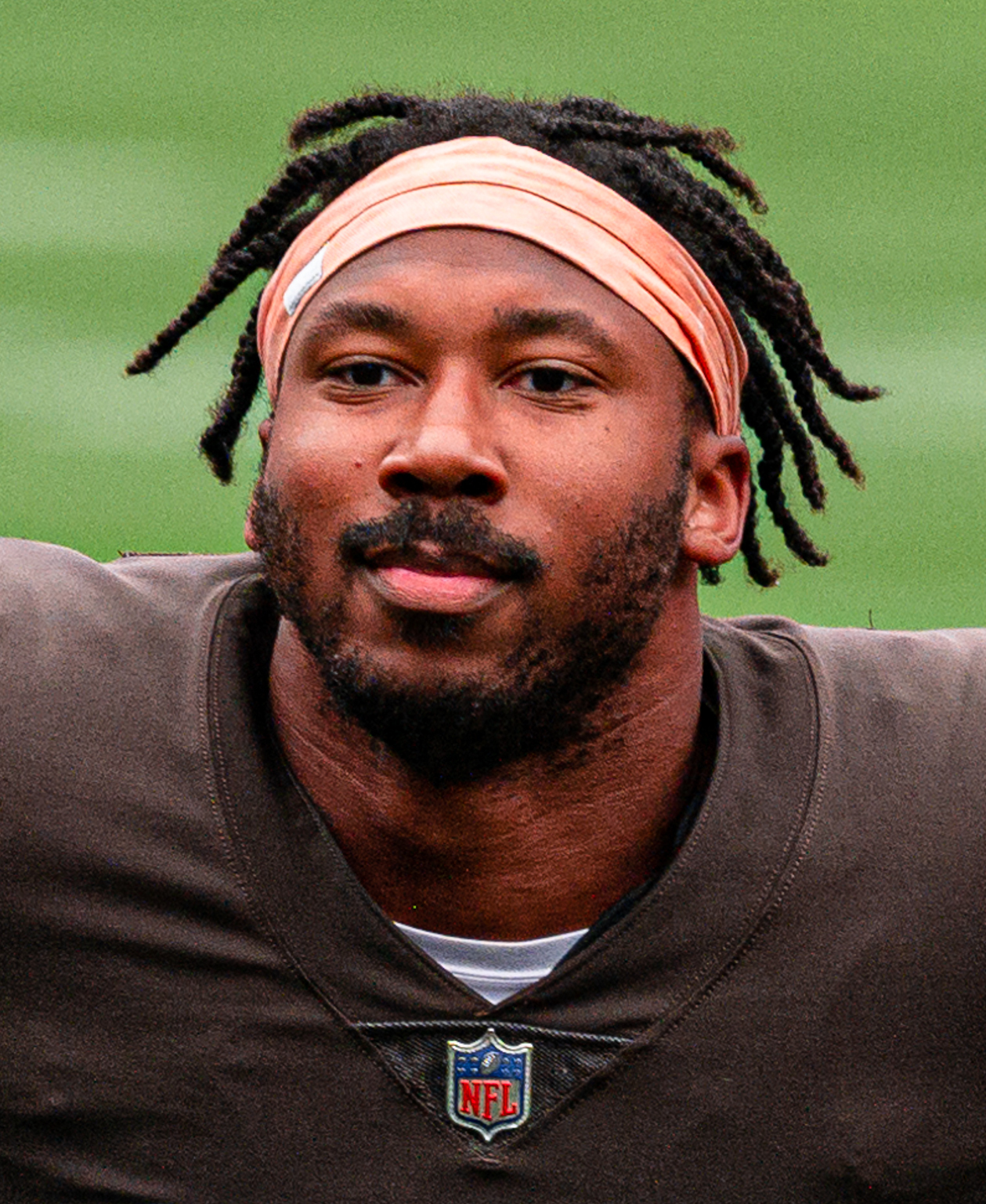
Myles Garrett was named the Defensive Player of the Year.

Award winners
Award	Winner	Position	Team	Ref.
Most Valuable Player	Matthew Stafford	Quarterback	Los Angeles Rams	
Offensive Player of the Year	Jaxon Smith-Njigba	Wide receiver	Seattle Seahawks	
Defensive Player of the Year	Myles Garrett	Defensive end	Cleveland Browns	
Offensive Rookie of the Year	Tetairoa McMillan	Wide receiver	Carolina Panthers	
Defensive Rookie of the Year	Carson Schwesinger	Linebacker	Cleveland Browns	
Protector of the Year	Joe Thuney	Guard	Chicago Bears	
Comeback Player of the Year	Christian McCaffrey	Running back	San Francisco 49ers	
Coach of the Year	Mike Vrabel	Head coach	New England Patriots	
Assistant Coach of the Year	Josh McDaniels	Offensive coordinator	New England Patriots	
Walter Payton Man of the Year	Bobby Wagner	Linebacker	Washington Commanders	
Salute to Service Award	Christian McCaffrey	Running back	San Francisco 49ers	
Deacon Jones Award	Myles Garrett	Defensive end	Cleveland Browns	
Jim Brown Award	James Cook	Running back	Buffalo Bills	
Art Rooney Award	Budda Baker	Safety	Arizona Cardinals	
Moment of the Year	Caleb Williams's game-winning touchdown pass in overtime to D. J. Moore vs. the Green Bay Packers on December 20, 2025	—N/a	Chicago Bears	
FedEx Air & Ground Players of the Year	Drake Maye	Quarterback	New England Patriots	
FedEx Air & Ground Players of the Year	Christian McCaffrey	Running back	San Francisco 49ers	
FedEx Air & Ground Players of the Year	Jaxon Smith-Njigba	Wide receiver	Seattle Seahawks	
Pepsi Rookie of the Year	Tyler Shough	Quarterback	New Orleans Saints	
NFL Fan of the Year	Ed Callahan	—N/a	Philadelphia Eagles	
Don Shula High School Coach of the Year	Dave Ettinger (Nominated by the New York Giants)	Head coach	Garden City High School (NY)	
Don Shula High School Coach of the Year	Dylen Smith (Nominated by the Los Angeles Chargers)	Head coach	Palisades Charter High School (CA)	
NFL FLAG Players of the Year Award (Note: Winners of the award consist of one male and one female from the United States who play for teams affiliated with NFL Flag football and "represent the highest level of competition, character, and commitment to the game".)	Ava Rotondi	—N/a	St. Joseph by the Sea High School (NY)	
NFL FLAG Players of the Year Award	Brysen Wright	—N/a	Mandarin High School (FL)	

== 2026 Hall of Fame class ==
2026 Hall of Fame class
Player	Position	Team(s)	Ref.
Drew Brees	Quarterback	San Diego Chargers (2001–2005); New Orleans Saints (2006–2020)	
Roger Craig	Running back / Fullback	San Francisco 49ers (1983–1990); Los Angeles Raiders (1991); Minnesota Vikings (1992–1993)	
Larry Fitzgerald	Wide receiver	Arizona Cardinals (2004–2020)	
Luke Kuechly	Linebacker	Carolina Panthers (2012–2019)	
Adam Vinatieri	Placekicker	New England Patriots (1996–2005); Indianapolis Colts (2006–2019)	
