= Carson Schwesinger =

American football player (born 2003)

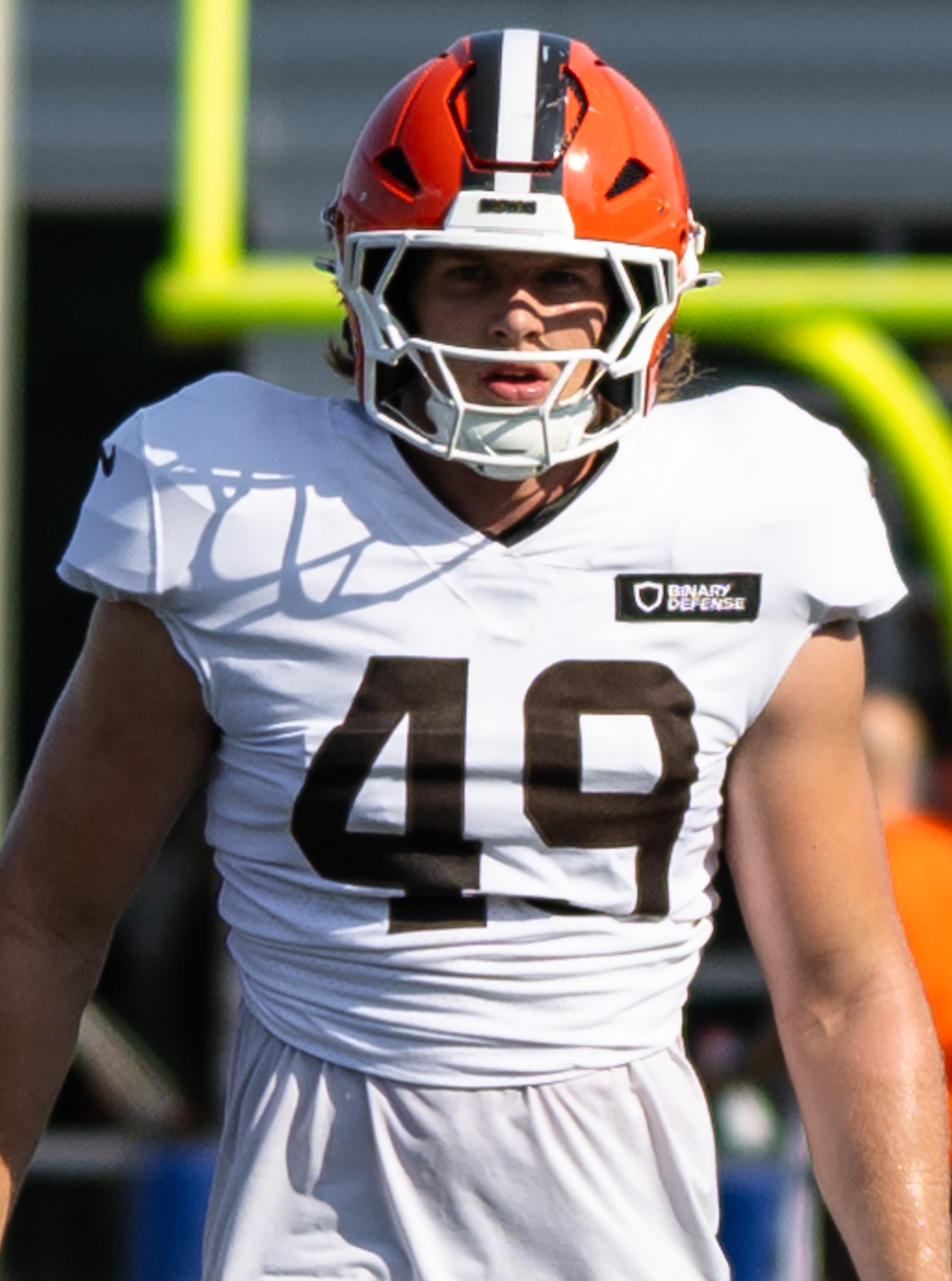
- Schwesinger with the Cleveland Browns in 2025

No. 49 – Cleveland Browns
- Position: Linebacker
- Roster status: Active

Personal information
- Born: February 24, 2003 (age 23); Moorpark, California, U.S.
- Listed height: 6 ft 3 in (1.91 m)
- Listed weight: 242 lb (110 kg)

Career information
- High school: Oaks Christian (Westlake Village, California)
- College: UCLA (2021–2024)
- NFL draft: 2025: 2nd round, 33rd overall pick

Career history
- Cleveland Browns (2025–present)

Awards and highlights
- NFL Defensive Rookie of the Year (2025); PFWA All-Rookie Team (2025); First-team All-American (2024)

Career NFL statistics as of Week 10, 2026
- Tackles: 258
- Sacks: 5.5
- Forced fumbles: 3
- Pass deflections: 4
- Interceptions: 2
- Stats at Pro Football Reference

Carson James Schwesinger (/ˈʃwɛsɪndʒər/ SHWESS-in-JURR; born February 24, 2003) is an American professional football linebacker for the Cleveland Browns of the National Football League (NFL). Schwesinger played college football for the UCLA Bruins and was selected by the Browns in the second round of the 2025 NFL draft, where he was named the Defensive Rookie of the Year.

== Early life ==
Schwesinger was born on February 24, 2003, in Moorpark, California. He attended Oaks Christian School in Westlake Village, California, and was an unranked recruit. He committed to play college football for the UCLA Bruins, joining the team as a walk-on.

== College career ==
At UCLA, Schwesinger played 26 games in his first three collegiate seasons from 2021 to 2023, recording 27 tackles, with three being for a loss, and a sack. Heading into the 2024 season, he was named one of the team captains. In week ten of the 2024 season, Schwesinger notched 13 tackles, a sack, and two pass deflections, as he helped UCLA to a 27–20 win against Nebraska. In week 11, He tallied seven tackles along with two interceptions, as he helped the Bruins to a win over Iowa. For his performance versus the Hawkeyes, Schwesinger was named the Big Ten Conference defensive player of the week. For his performance during the 2024 season, Schwesinger was named a semifinalist for both the Butkus Award and the Burlsworth Trophy.

== Professional career ==
Pre-draft measurables
Height	Weight	Arm length	Hand span	Wingspan	Vertical jump	Bench press
6 ft 2 1/2 in (1.89 m)	242 lb (110 kg)	31 5/8 in (0.80 m)	9 1/4 in (0.23 m)	6 ft 5 1/2 in (1.97 m)	39.5 in (1.00 m)	20 reps
All values from NFL Combine

=== 2025 ===
Schwesinger was selected with the 33rd overall pick in the second round of the 2025 NFL draft by the Cleveland Browns. In Week 8 against the New England Patriots, he recorded his first career interception on a pass from Drake Maye. He was named NFL Defensive Rookie of the Month for November. Schwesinger started 16 games as a rookie, leading the team with 156 tackles, which was sixth in the league, along with 2.5 sacks, three passes defensed, and two interceptions. On January 3, 2026, Schwesinger was placed on season-ending injured reserve due to a quad injury. He was named to the PFWA NFL All-Rookie Team for the 2025 season. Schwesinger won Defensive Rookie of the Year for the 2025 NFL season. He was ranked 93rd by his fellow players on the NFL Top 100 Players of 2026.

== Personal life ==
Schwesinger is a Christian. In June 2026, he was baptized in Berea, Ohio during an event hosted by Metro Cleveland Fellowship of Christian Athletes.

== Career statistics ==
=== NFL ===
Year	Team	Games		Tackles					Interceptions						Fumbles				
Year	Team	GP	GS	Cmb	Solo	Ast	Sck	TFL	Int	Yds	Avg	Lng	TD	PD	FF	Fmb	FR	Yds	TD
2025	CLE	16	16	156	67	89	2.5	11	2	16	8.0	9	0	3	0	0	0	0	0
2026	CLE	10	10	102	48	54	3.0	6	0	0	0.0	0	0	1	3	0	0	0	0
Career		26	26	258	115	143	5.5	17	2	16	8.0	9	0	4	3	0	0	0	0

=== College ===
Legend
	Led NCAA Division I FBS
**Bold**	Career high

Year	Team	GP	Tackles					Interceptions					Fumbles			
Year	Team	GP	Cmb	Solo	Ast	Sck	TFL	Int	Yds	Avg	TD	PD	FF	FR	Yds	TD
2022	UCLA	13	15	13	2	0.0	0.5	0	0	—	0	0	0	0	0	0
2023	UCLA	13	12	6	6	1.0	2.0	0	0	—	0	0	0	0	0	0
2024	UCLA	12	**136**	**90**	**46**	**4.0**	**8.5**	**2**	**13**	**6.5**	0	**3**	**1**	0	0	0
Career		38	163	109	54	5.0	11.0	2	13	6.5	0	3	1	0	0	0

== See also ==
- List of NCAA major college football yearly tackles leaders
