= Matthew Stafford =

American football player (born 1988)

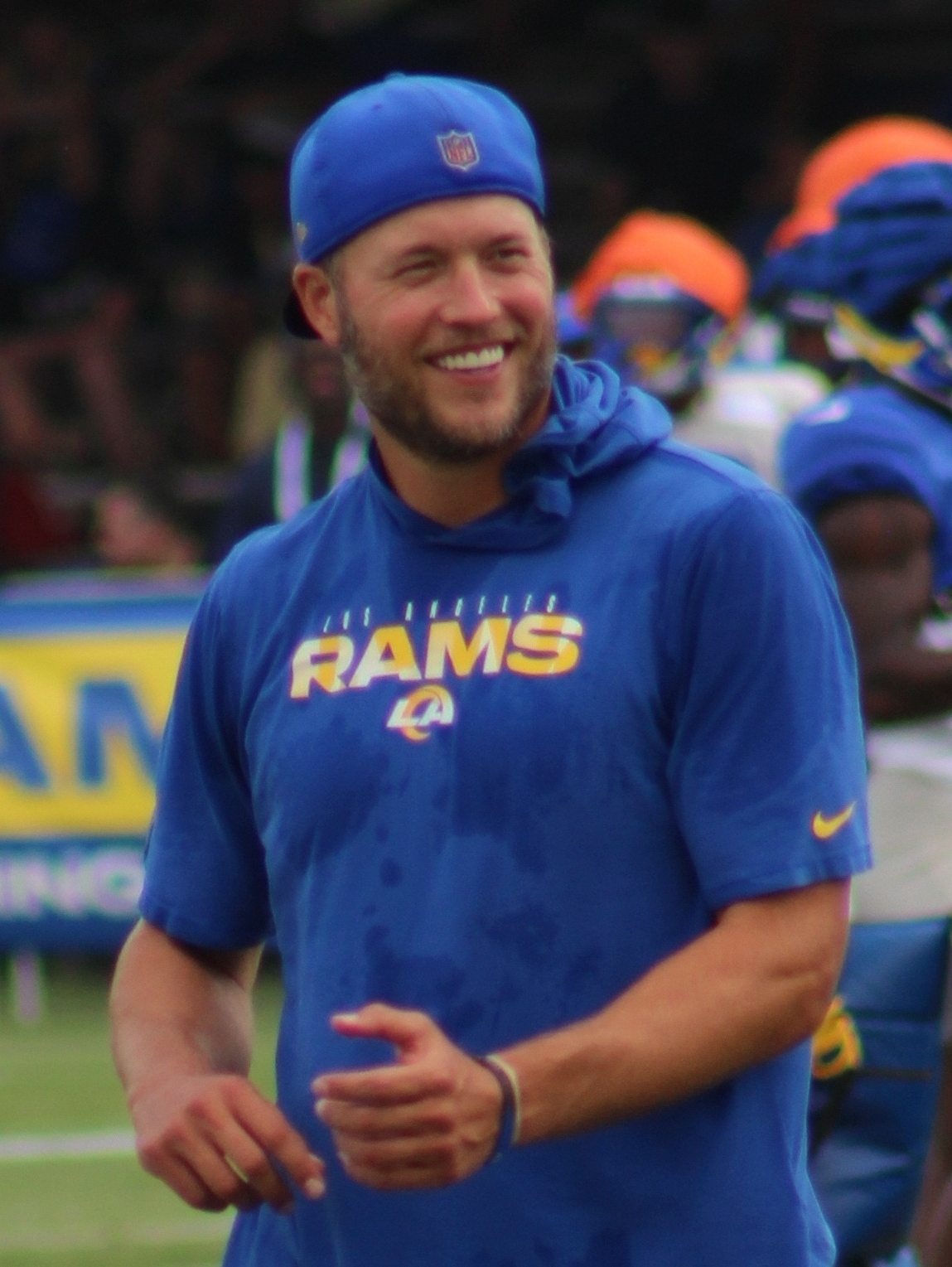
- Stafford with the Los Angeles Rams in 2023

No. 9 – Los Angeles Rams
- Position: Quarterback
- Roster status: Active

Personal information
- Born: February 7, 1988 (age 38); Tampa, Florida, U.S.
- Listed height: 6 ft 2 in (1.88 m)
- Listed weight: 214 lb (97 kg)

Career information
- High school: Highland Park (Dallas, Texas)
- College: Georgia (2006–2008)
- NFL draft: 2009: 1st round, 1st overall pick

Career history
- Detroit Lions (2009–2020); Los Angeles Rams (2021–present)

Awards and highlights
- Super Bowl champion (LVI); NFL Most Valuable Player (2025); NFL Comeback Player of the Year (2011); First-team All-Pro (2025); 3× Pro Bowl (2014, 2023, 2025); NFL passing yards leader (2025); NFL passing touchdowns leader (2025); First-team All-American (2008); NFL records: Most pick-sixes thrown: 33; Most game-winning drives in a single season: 8 (tied) (Note: with Kirk Cousins); Most passing touchdowns in a game by a rookie: 5 (tied) (Note: with Ray Buivid, Jameis Winston, Deshaun Watson, Daniel Jones, and C. J. Stroud)

Career NFL statistics as of Week 10, 2026
- Passing attempts: 9,135
- Passing completions: 5,810
- Completion percentage: 63.6%
- TD–INT: 442–206
- Passing yards: 67,139
- Passer rating: 92.4
- Rushing yards: 1,374
- Rushing touchdowns: 15
- Stats at Pro Football Reference

John Matthew Stafford (born February 7, 1988) is an American professional football quarterback for the Los Angeles Rams of the National Football League (NFL). He played college football for the Georgia Bulldogs, receiving first-team All-American honors in 2008, and was selected first overall by the Detroit Lions in the 2009 NFL draft.

Stafford ranks in the top 10 of all time in pass attempts, pass completions, passing yards, and passing touchdowns. He is currently sixth all time in passing yards per game and the fastest player in NFL history to have reached 40,000 career passing yards.

As the Lions' primary starter from 2009 to 2020, Stafford had a breakout year in 2011 when he became the fourth quarterback in NFL history to throw for more than 5,000 yards in a single season, while also leading Detroit to their first playoff appearance since 1999. He helped the Lions reach the playoffs two more times in 2014 and 2016, earning Pro Bowl honors during the former and setting the NFL season record for comeback wins in the latter.

After mutually agreeing to part ways with the Lions, Stafford was traded to the Rams in 2021 and led them to victory in Super Bowl LVI. In 2025, Stafford led the league in passing yards and touchdowns for the first time in his career, earning him NFL Most Valuable Player honors.

== Early life ==
Stafford was born on February 7, 1988, in Tampa, Florida, to John and Margaret Stafford. He lived in Dunwoody, Georgia, while John attended graduate school at the University of Georgia. Stafford has an older sister named Page. His family then moved to Highland Park, Texas, and Stafford attended Highland Park High School with Los Angeles Dodgers pitcher and Cy Young Award winner Clayton Kershaw. He was coached by Randy Allen and was widely considered to be one of the best high school quarterbacks in the United States in the class of 2006, ranked ahead of Tim Tebow.

In 2005, Stafford led his team to a perfect 15–0 record and won the UIL 4A Division I State Championship. During the playoff run, Stafford beat Ryan Mallett's Texarkana Texas 38–31, as well as Jevan Snead's Stephenville 41–38. Stafford had over 4,000 yards passing despite not playing in the first three games of the season due to a knee injury. Stafford received numerous accolades, including being named to the Parade All-America Team and the USA Today Pre-Season Super 25 in 2005. He also won the MVP and Best Arm awards at the 2005 EA Sports Elite 11 Quarterback Camp and was named the 2005 EA Sports National Player of the Year. Regarded as a five-star recruit by Rivals.com, Stafford was listed as the No. 1 pro-style quarterback prospect in the class of 2006 by Rivals.com.

Before he had even started a game at the collegiate level, analyst Mel Kiper Jr. predicted, correctly, that Stafford would eventually be the first pick in the NFL draft.

College recruiting
Name	Hometown	School	Height	Weight	40^{‡}	Commit date
Matthew Stafford; QB	Dallas, Texas	Highland Park HS	6 ft 2 in (1.88 m)	210 lb (95 kg)	4.7	May 13, 2005
Matthew Stafford; QB	Recruit ratings: Scout: Rivals: (93)					
Overall recruit ranking: Scout: 2 (QB) Rivals: 1 (QB) ESPN: 1 (QB)
Note: In many cases, Scout, Rivals, 247Sports, On3, and ESPN may conflict in their listings of height and weight.; In these cases, the average was taken. ESPN grades are on a 100-point scale.; Sources: "Georgia Football Commitments". Rivals.; "2006 Georgia Football Commits". Scout.; "ESPN". ESPN.; "Scout.com Team Recruiting Rankings". Scout.; "2006 Team Ranking". Rivals.com.

== College career ==
=== 2006 season ===
"Matthew Stafford eventually will be the No. 1 pick in the NFL Draft. Write that down."

— Football analyst Mel Kiper, Jr. on ESPN Radio in September 2006.

Stafford graduated early from high school and enrolled at the University of Georgia in January, where he became the first true freshman quarterback to start for the Georgia Bulldogs football team since Quincy Carter in 1998, and first out of high school to start since Eric Zeier in 1991. Stafford wore number 7 at Georgia. He completed five of 12 passes for 102 yards and a touchdown in a Georgia spring game.

Stafford debuted late in the season opener of the 2006 season against Western Kentucky and went 3 of 5 passing for 40 yards and a touchdown pass in the 48–12 victory. During the season's second game, against South Carolina, starting quarterback Joe Tereshinski III was injured, forcing Stafford to come off the bench. Although he completed just 8 of 19 passes for 171 yards and three interceptions, Georgia won the game, 18–0. Against University of Alabama Birmingham the following week, Stafford made his first collegiate start. Georgia won, 34–0. Victories over Colorado and Ole Miss improved Georgia's record to 5–0, but the heart of the conference schedule loomed.

The rest of the season was inconsistent for Stafford and the Bulldogs. Following home losses to both Tennessee and Vanderbilt, head coach Mark Richt named Stafford the starter for the rest of the season ahead of Tereshinski. Stafford completed 20 of 32 passes for 267 yards and two touchdowns in a 27–24 win over Mississippi State, and was named the Southeastern Conference (SEC) Freshman of the Week for his efforts. Statistically, he had his best game of the season against the No. 5 Auburn Tigers. Stafford finished the game 14 of 20 for 219 yards and a touchdown, and added 83 rushing yards and a touchdown on seven carries in Georgia's 37–15 upset victory. The following week, Stafford led the Bulldogs on a 12-play, 64-yard drive and threw a late game-winning touchdown pass to Mohamed Massaquoi in Georgia's 15–12 victory over No. 16 Georgia Tech.

Stafford completed his freshman season by leading Georgia to a 31–24 come-from-behind victory over Virginia Tech in the Chick-fil-A Bowl, after the Bulldogs trailed 21–3 at halftime. Stafford threw for 129 yards and a second half touchdown to spark the comeback and allow Georgia to finish the season with a 9–4 record. Stafford finished with 1,749 passing yards, seven touchdowns, and 13 interceptions.

=== 2007 season ===
Stafford threw for 234 yards and two touchdowns as the Bulldogs defeated the Oklahoma State Cowboys 35–14 in the season opener. Following a 16–12 loss to South Carolina and a 45–16 victory over Western Carolina, the Bulldogs avoided an 0–2 start in SEC play by escaping Bryant–Denny Stadium with an overtime win over Alabama. Stafford connected with senior wide receiver Mikey Henderson on the Bulldogs' first play from scrimmage in overtime for the winning score. Following the Alabama game, Georgia won two of their next three. In the win over No. 9 Florida, he completed 11 of 18 passes for 217 yards and three touchdowns, including a career-long touchdown pass of 84 yards to Mohamed Massaquoi and a 53-yard touchdown pass to Henderson. Georgia closed out the regular season on a six-game winning streak. The wins over Florida, Auburn, and Georgia Tech marked the first time that Georgia had defeated all three rivals in the same season since 1982.

Stafford had 175 yards passing and a touchdown pass during Georgia's 41–10 rout of the No. 10 Hawaii Warriors in the 2008 Sugar Bowl. He completed 194 of 348 passes for 2,523 yards (194.1/game) and 19 touchdowns as well as two rushing touchdowns for the season. He finished fifth in the SEC in pass completions and sixth in passing touchdowns. Stafford helped lead Georgia to an 11–2 record, their best mark since the 2002 season, and a No. 2 ranking in the Final AP Poll.

=== 2008 season ===
Stafford was chosen to Athlon Sports' preseason Heisman Favorites Others To Watch list. Georgia was ranked No. 1 in both the preseason coaches poll and the AP Poll, marking the first time Georgia has ever been No. 1 in the preseason version of either poll. The team entered the 2008 season with the longest active winning streak among the 66 BCS conference teams, having won its last seven games of the 2007 season. He helped lead them to victories in their first four games to move the winning streak to 11. Stafford and the Bulldogs suffered their first setback in a 41–30 loss to No. 8 Alabama on September 27. Stafford rebounded by helping lead the team to victories in five of the next six games, the lone exception being a 49–10 loss to the eventual National Champion Florida Gators. In that stretch, he threw for over 300 yards in victories over Tennessee and Kentucky. In the final regular season game against Georgia Tech, Stafford completed 24 out of 39 attempts for 407 yards and five touchdowns, setting personal collegiate highs for passing yards and touchdowns in a single game, albeit a 45–42 loss. Stafford finished the season with a conference-leading 235 pass completions for 3,459 passing yards, the second most in school history, and 25 touchdowns, the single-season record for passing touchdowns. He led the SEC in pass attempts and passing completions while finishing third for passing touchdowns. Georgia finished the regular season with a 9–3 mark and qualified for the Capitol One Bowl. After defeating Michigan State 24–12 and winning the MVP of the 2009 Capital One Bowl, Stafford finished his three years at Georgia with a 3–0 record in bowl games and a 6–3 record in rivalry games (1–2 against Florida, 3–0 against Auburn, and 2–1 against Georgia Tech). Stafford chose to forgo his senior season and entered the 2009 NFL draft.

== Professional career ==
=== NFL draft ===
In April 2008, several NFL analysts predicted that Stafford would be the No. 1 pick in the 2009 NFL draft if he chose to leave school early. Stafford eventually did, and on April 24, 2009, agreed to record contract terms with the Detroit Lions to become the first overall pick of the 2009 NFL draft, one day before the draft was held. He became the fourth player out of Georgia to be the first overall selection in the draft and the first since Harry Babcock in 1953. The six-year contract reportedly contained $41.7 million in guaranteed money (the most guaranteed to any player in NFL history until July 30, 2010, when quarterback Sam Bradford signed a deal with $50 million guaranteed) and carried a total value of up to $78 million. Detroit negotiated a deal with Stafford on April 24, 2009, less than 24 hours before the draft.

Pre-draft measurables
Height	Weight	Arm length	Hand span	40-yard dash	10-yard split	20-yard split	20-yard shuttle	Three-cone drill	Vertical jump	Broad jump	Wonderlic
6 ft 2 1/4 in (1.89 m)	225 lb (102 kg)	33 1/4 in (0.84 m)	10 in (0.25 m)	4.81 s	1.72 s	2.83 s	4.47 s	7.06 s	30.5 in (0.77 m)	8 ft 11 in (2.72 m)	38
All values from NFL Combine

=== Detroit Lions ===
==== 2009 season ====
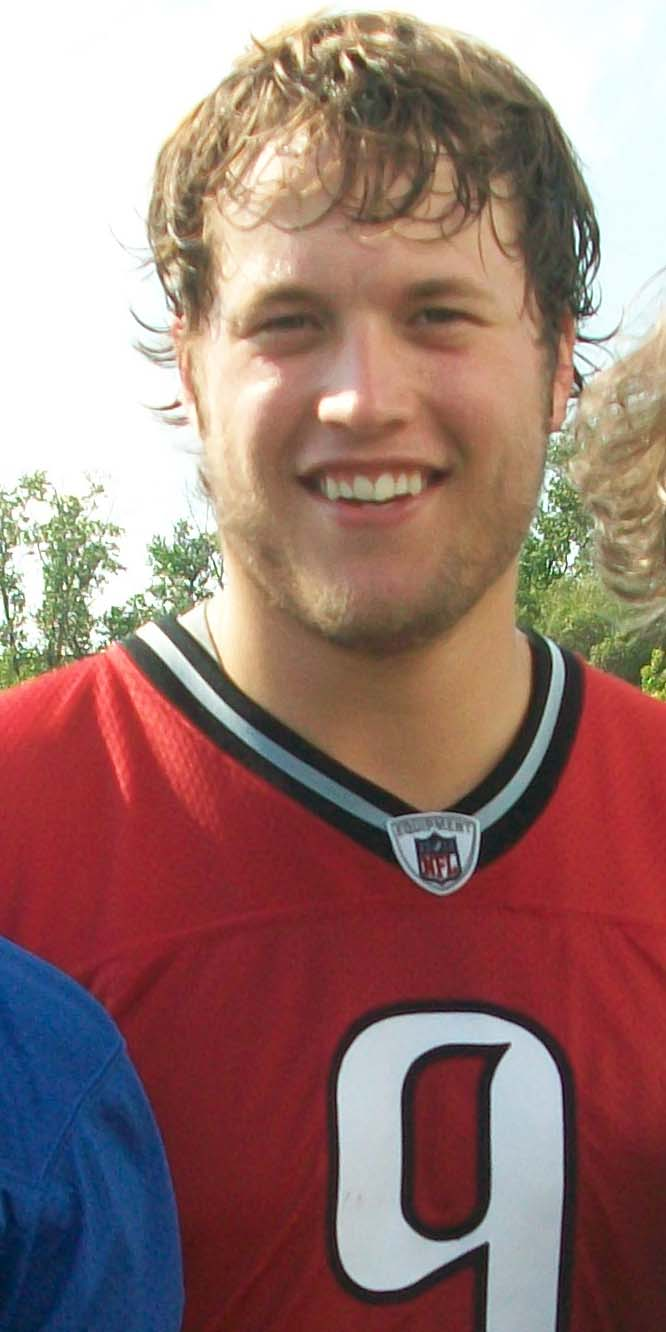
Stafford in 2009

On September 6, 2009, Lions head coach Jim Schwartz announced that Stafford would be the Lions' starting quarterback heading into the season. He was the first Lions rookie quarterback to start in Week 1 since Greg Landry in 1968. Stafford completed 16-of-37 passes for 205 yards and three interceptions while scoring his first NFL touchdown on a one-yard touchdown early in the third quarter of the 45–27 loss to the eventual Super Bowl champion New Orleans Saints. In the next game against the Minnesota Vikings, Stafford had 152 passing yards, a touchdown, and two interceptions during the 27–13 loss. Stafford recorded his first win the following week against the Washington Redskins, throwing for 241 yards and a touchdown in the 19–14 victory. The win was significant for the Lions as it snapped a 19-game losing streak going back to the 2007 season.

During Week 11, Stafford threw for 422 yards, five touchdowns, and two interceptions in a narrow 38–37 victory over the Cleveland Browns. He became the youngest quarterback ever to throw five touchdowns in a game, being more than a year younger than the former record holder, Dan Marino. In a thrilling ending, Stafford received high acclaim when he stepped back onto the field despite team doctors' urge to stay on the sideline after suffering a separated shoulder on the previous play and threw the final touchdown pass as time expired. Stafford's 422 passing yards was a record for a rookie at that time. For his performance, Stafford was named NFC Offensive Player of the Week and Pepsi Rookie of the Week. He was mic'd up for the game for NFL Films. The show's creator Steve Sabol said it was the most dramatic performance he's seen in the show's 30-year history. In the next game against the Green Bay Packers on Thanksgiving, Stafford completed 20-of-43 passes for 213 yards, a touchdown, and four interceptions during the 34–12 loss.

Stafford was placed on injured reserve on December 24 for the minor knee injury. He finished his rookie year with 2,267 passing yards, 13 touchdowns, and 20 interceptions to go along with 20 carries for 108 yards and two touchdowns in 10 games and starts. In all of his starts, Stafford either threw or ran for a touchdown despite the Lions finishing 2–8 in games that he started in. The Lions did not win another game without Stafford and finished with a 2–14 record overall.

==== 2010 season ====
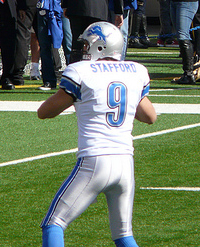
Stafford in 2010

Stafford injured his right shoulder during the season-opening 19–14 loss to the Bears. Stafford returned in Week 8 against the Redskins and threw for 212 yards, four touchdowns, and an interception to lead the Lions to a 37–25 victory. In the next game against the New York Jets, he re-injured his shoulder during the fourth quarter of the 23–20 overtime loss after throwing for 240 yards and two touchdowns while also rushing touchdown. The Lions announced that Dr. James Andrews had performed surgery on Stafford's throwing shoulder, which included an AC joint repair and a clavicle shaving, prematurely ending his season.

Stafford finished his second professional season with 535 passing yards, six touchdowns, and an interception to go along with four carries for 11 yards and a touchdown in three games and starts.

==== 2011 season: Playoff debut ====
The Lions opened the season against the Tampa Bay Buccaneers with high expectations. Stafford played well, throwing for 305 yards, three touchdowns, and an interception in a 27–20 road victory, the first season opener the Lions had won since 2007. Another strong performance followed the following week against the Kansas City Chiefs with Stafford throwing for four touchdowns, 294 yards, and an interception in a 48–3 blowout victory, the largest win margin in team history. Stafford won the FedEx Air NFL Player of the Week for his performance. In Weeks 3 and 4, Stafford led the team to consecutive comeback victories, a 26–23 overtime road victory over the Vikings after trailing 20–0 at halftime in Week 3, and a 34–30 road victory over the Dallas Cowboys after trailing 27–3 with 12:27 left in the third quarter. The 24-point comeback marked the largest in franchise history.

During Week 5 against the Bears on Monday Night Football, Stafford completed 19-of-26 passes for 219 yards and two touchdowns in the 24–13 victory. This marked the first time the Lions had gone 5–0 since 1956, the year before they won their last NFL Championship. During a Week 10 37–13 road loss to the Bears, Stafford threw for 329 yards, a touchdown, and four interceptions, including two that were returned for touchdowns on consecutive drives. The game was marred by a brawl that began when Stafford threw Bears cornerback D. J. Moore to the ground by his helmet during a block on an interception return. In response, Moore attacked Stafford and a sideline-clearing brawl ensued. Stafford was fined $7,500 for his role in the brawl.

During Week 11, Stafford threw for 335 yards and tied his career-high with five touchdowns as the Lions defeated the Carolina Panthers in another comeback, 49–35, after trailing 24–7 in the second quarter. Stafford became the first quarterback since at least 1950 to win back-to-back games after trailing by at least 20 points, the first to win three games in a season after trailing by at least 17 points, and the first to win four games in a season after trailing by at least 13 points according to STATS, LLC.

During the regular-season finale against the Packers, Stafford became the fourth quarterback in NFL history and third in the 2011 season, along with Tom Brady and Drew Brees, to throw for 5,000 passing yards in a season after recording a career-high 520 passing yards in the 45–41 road loss. In this game, Stafford threw an interception on an attempted 37-yard touchdown pass that, had he been successful, he would've broken Norm Van Brocklin's record for most yards in a game. The accomplishment made Stafford the second-youngest quarterback in NFL history, at the age of 23 years and 328 days, to reach 5,000 yards, behind only Dan Marino. Stafford became the first player in Lions' franchise history to have two games in a single season with at least five passing touchdowns. Over the last four games of the 2011 regular season, Stafford became the only quarterback in NFL history to pass for over 1,500 yards (1,511) and 14 touchdowns over a four-game span. Stafford and the Lions finished the regular season with a 10–6 record, good enough for the Lions to make their first playoff appearance since 1999.

During the Wild Card Round against the New Orleans Saints, Stafford threw for 380 yards and three touchdowns and added a rushing touchdown. However, he threw two late interceptions in the fourth quarter that sealed the 45–28 loss for the Lions. Stafford was named a Pro Bowl alternate for the NFC after the 2011 NFL season. He was later named the 2011 Pro Football Weekly Comeback Player of the Year, AP Comeback Player of the Year, and NFL Alumni Quarterback of the Year. Stafford was ranked 41st by his fellow players on the NFL Top 100 Players of 2012.

==== 2012 season ====
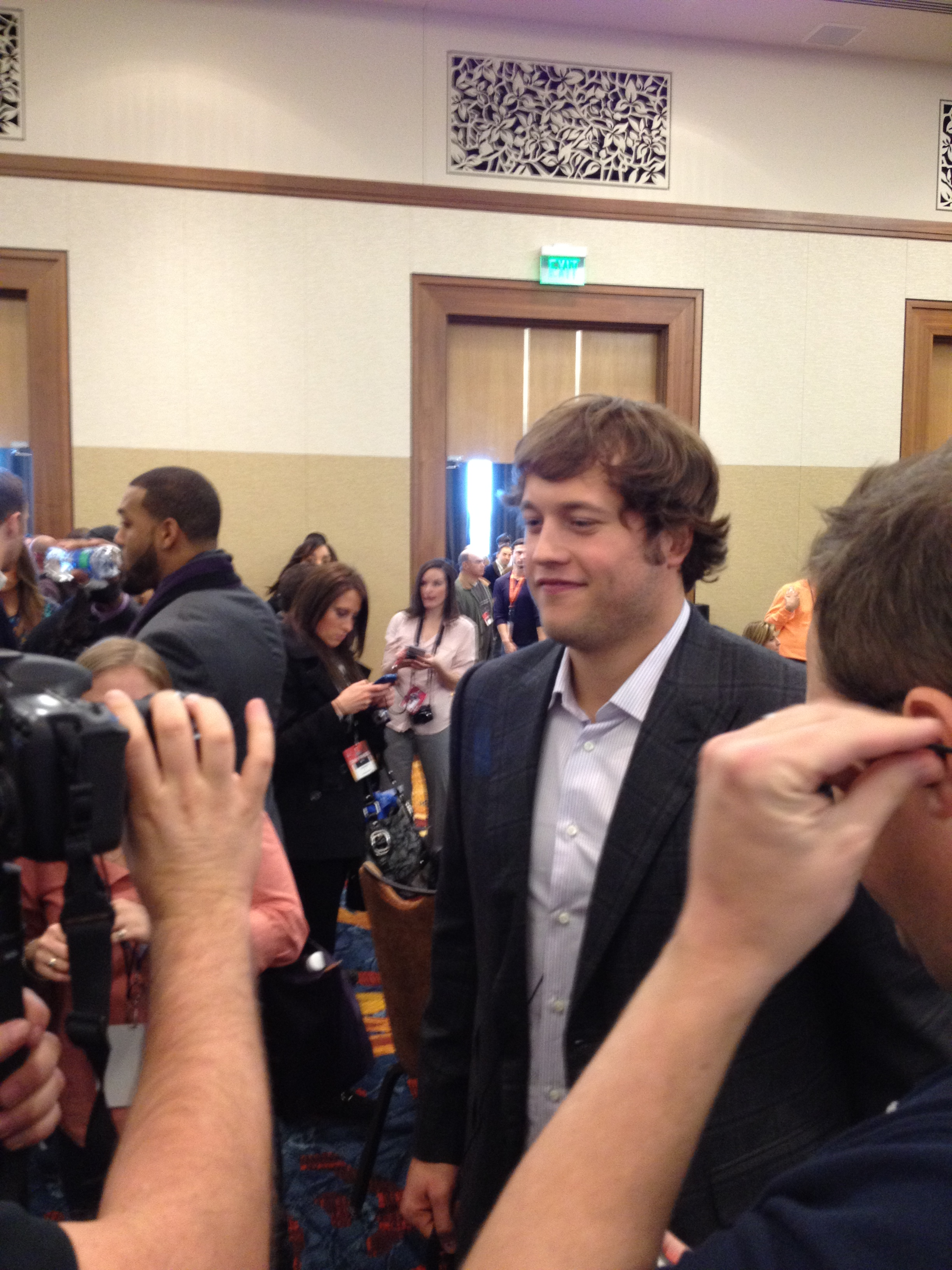
Stafford visiting the White House in 2012

While the 2011 season proved to be the best season of Stafford's young career, 2012 was one full of setbacks. During the opening game against the St. Louis Rams, Stafford threw three interceptions and one touchdown pass. However, the Lions won the game 27–23. Stafford and the Lions lost the next three games to the San Francisco 49ers, Tennessee Titans, and Vikings. In the ensuing weeks, the Lions managed to win three games, including impressive comeback wins against the Seattle Seahawks and Philadelphia Eagles, and a dominating performance against the Jacksonville Jaguars. These proved to be the final winning games of the 2012 season as the Lions ended the season with an eight-game losing streak and with a 4–12 record. One highlight in the losing streak was the Week 16 matchup against the Atlanta Falcons, where Stafford recorded a career-high 37 completions for 443 passing yards and an interception in the 31–18 loss.

Stafford finished the season with a league-leading 435 pass completions for 20 touchdown passes, significantly less compared to the 41 touchdowns he passed for in the 2011 season; 17 interceptions, one more than 2011, and second most in his career since his rookie season; 4,967 passing yards on 727 attempts (an NFL record; the previous record was 691 by Drew Bledsoe); and a QB rating of 79.8, the lowest since his rookie season. Stafford rushed for a career-high 126 yards and four rushing touchdowns on 35 carries. He was ranked No. 76 among his fellow players on the NFL Top 100 Players of 2013.

==== 2013 season ====
On July 7, 2013, Stafford agreed to a three-year, $53 million extension with the Lions with $41.5 million guaranteed through 2017.

During Week 4 against the Bears, Stafford completed 23-of-35 passes for 242 yards, a touchdown, and an interception in the 40–32 victory. This gave him 14,069 yards through 49 games, surpassing Kurt Warner (13,864) for the best 50-game start to a career.

"I might (reflect on that) when I'm done playing someday," Stafford said. "I had no idea about that, or that it was coming. It's something that I'll probably look back on when I'm done and realize it was something pretty special." Stafford set a record for completions over 50 games at 1,214, over Marc Bulger's 1,115. He finished second in career 300-yard passing performances through 50 games at 19, trailing Warner's 29.

Stafford led the Lions to a 5–3 record entering their mid-season bye. During Week 8, the Lions narrowly defeated the Cowboys 31–30 in the final game before the bye, throwing for 488 yards and a touchdown despite two interceptions; down 30–24 with just 62 seconds to work with and no timeouts Stafford completed a 23-yard pass to Calvin Johnson to the Cowboys 1-yard line; he hustled the team to the line as though to spike the ball, but instead jumped over the line for the winning touchdown with 14 seconds to go, to go to 5–3.

However, the Lions finished 2–6 for a final record of 7–9. Lions head coach Jim Schwartz was fired following the season. Stafford finished the 2013 season with 4,650 passing yards, 29 touchdowns, and 19 interceptions to go along with 37 carries for 69 yards and two touchdowns. He was ranked No. 100 on the NFL Top 100 Players of 2014 players' list.

==== 2014 season ====
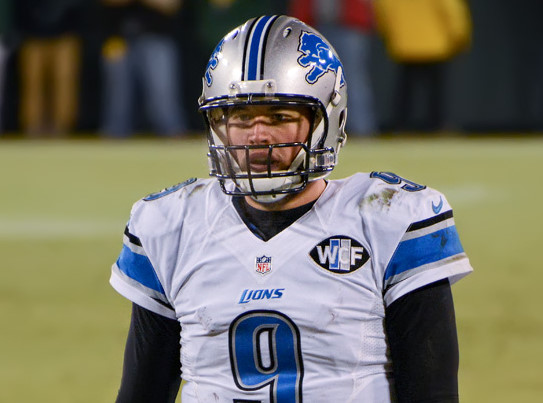
Stafford in 2014

On January 14, 2014, the Lions announced Jim Caldwell as their new head coach. The Lions rebounded from a disappointing 2013 campaign by finishing with an 11–5 record, thus earning the NFC's 6th seed, their first playoff appearance since 2011.

Stafford began the 2014 season strong, throwing for 346 yards and two touchdowns while also rushing for a touchdown in the season-opening 35–14 victory over the New York Giants.. During Week 13 against the Bears on Thanksgiving, he threw for a season-high 390 passing yards and two touchdowns in the 34–17 victory. During the season, Stafford became the fastest quarterback in NFL history to reach 20,000 passing yards. He accomplished the feat in his 71st game, breaking Dan Marino's mark of 74. He led the NFL with five game-winning drives. Stafford finished the 2014 season with 4,257 passing yards, 22 touchdowns, and 12 interceptions to go along with 43 carries for 93 yards and two touchdowns.

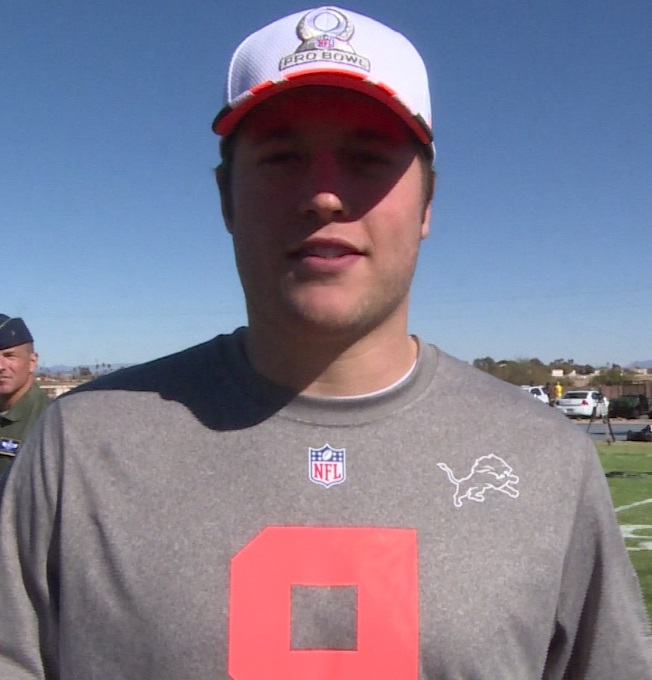
Stafford at the 2015 Pro Bowl

On January 4, 2015, Stafford and the Lions went against the Dallas Cowboys, in the Wild Card Round of the playoffs. After the Lions had a 20–7 lead in the third quarter, the Cowboys scored 17 unanswered points to win 24–20. In the fourth quarter, with the Lions up 20–17, Stafford threw a pass to tight end Brandon Pettigrew. The ball hit Cowboys linebacker Anthony Hitchens on the back. Pass interference was initially called on the Cowboys. However, the officials reversed the call on the series that ended up being crucial as the Lions were forced to punt later on the drive. Stafford threw for 323 yards, a touchdown, and an interception in the road loss.

On January 19, 2015, it was announced that Stafford was selected to the 2015 Pro Bowl, his first Pro Bowl appearance as a replacement for Peyton Manning of the Denver Broncos, due to a quad injury. Stafford was named Pro Bowl Offensive MVP after throwing for 316 passing yards, two touchdowns, and an interception.

==== 2015 season ====
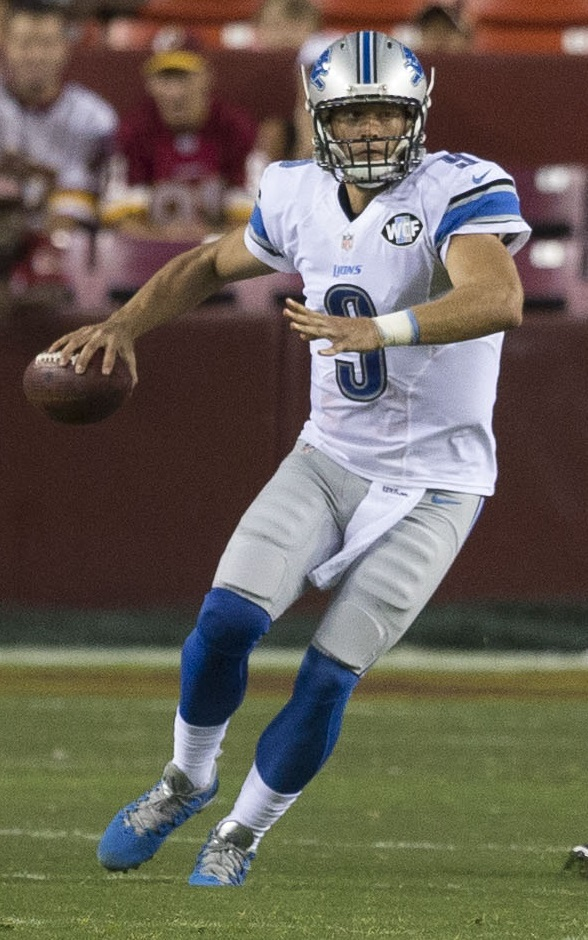
Stafford during the 2015 preseason in Landover

The 2015 season started rough for Stafford and the Lions with a 0–5 start. In the stretch, Stafford passed for six touchdowns and eight interceptions to go along with an average of 241 passing yards per game. The Lions got their first victory during Week 6 against the Bears, with Stafford recording 405 passing yards, four touchdowns, and an interception in the 37–34 overtime result.

During Week 12 against the Eagles on Thanksgiving, Stafford threw for 337 yards and five touchdowns in the 45–14 victory. It was the fourth time in Stafford's career with a five-touchdown game, becoming the tenth player in NFL history to pull off the feat. Two weeks later against the St. Louis Rams, Stafford reached 25,000 passing yards in his 90th career game, becoming the fastest quarterback to reach this milestone, surpassing the previous record held by Dan Marino of 92 games. The following week against the Saints, Stafford posted a single-game career high in passer rating, and broke Jon Kitna's single-game franchise record with an 88.0 completion percentage. Stafford finished the 35–27 victory completing 22-of-25 passes for 254 yards and three touchdowns to give him a career-high 148.6 passer rating.

Stafford became the first quarterback in NFL history to complete 60 percent or more of his passes in all 16 games. Stafford finished the 2015 season with 4,262 passing yards, 32 touchdowns, and 13 interceptions to go along with 44 carries for 159 yards and a touchdown. Despite his success, the Lions finished with a 7–9 record and missed the playoffs.

==== 2016 season ====
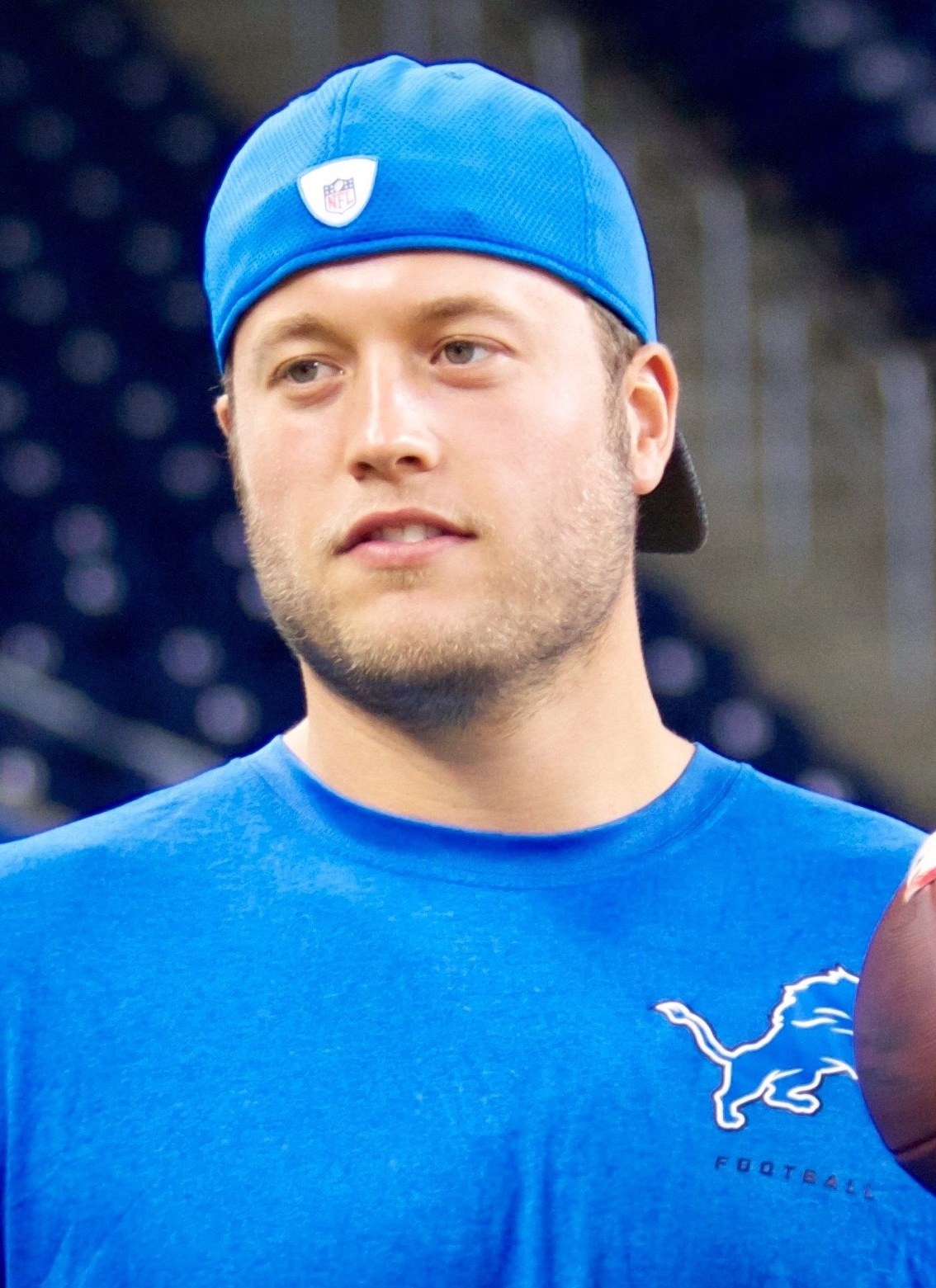
Stafford in 2016

Stafford started the 2016 season off with a strong performance against the Indianapolis Colts, finishing with 340 passing yards and three touchdowns in the 39–35 road victory. The Lions followed that up with three consecutive losses before getting a narrow 24–23 victory over the Eagles in Week 5 to have a 2–3 record. During Week 6 against the Los Angeles Rams, he had 270 passing yards and four touchdowns in the 31–28 victory. On December 11, 2016, Stafford broke Peyton Manning's NFL record of most fourth quarter comebacks in a season with eight. In his career, he has 25 such victories, the most in the NFL since he made his debut in 2009. Stafford got the Lions to a 9–4 start but he suffered a hand injury in Week 14 and lost the last three games of the season to finish 9–7. They managed to get the sixth seed in the playoffs, only to lose to the Seahawks 26–6 in the Wild Card Round. Stafford passed for 206 yards with no touchdowns or interceptions in the loss.

Stafford ended the season with 4,327 passing yards, 24 touchdowns and 10 interceptions – his sixth consecutive season with at least 4,000 passing yards. He became the fastest player in NFL history to reach the 30,000 career passing yards milestone. Stafford became the fourth quarterback in NFL history to throw for at least 30,000 in their first eight seasons. He was ranked 31st by his peers on the NFL Top 100 Players of 2017.

==== 2017 season ====
On August 28, 2017, Stafford signed a five-year, $135 million extension with $92 million guaranteed, making him the highest-paid player in NFL history at the time.

During the season-opener against the Arizona Cardinals, Stafford finished with 292 passing yards, four touchdowns, and an interception as the Lions rallied and won by a score of 35–23. It was his 27th fourth quarter/overtime comeback since 2011, the most in the league. In the next game against the Giants on Monday Night Football, Stafford threw his 193rd career touchdown pass during the 24–10 road victory, passing Bob Griese for 48th on the all-time touchdown pass list.

During a Week 8 20–15 loss to the Pittsburgh Steelers on Sunday Night Football, Stafford became the only player in NFL history to throw for more than 400 yards and no touchdowns in two different games. In the next game against the Packers, Stafford recorded his 200th career touchdown in the first quarter of the game, becoming the fourth quarterback in NFL history to do so before the age of 30, joining Brett Favre, Dan Marino, and Peyton Manning. During the regular-season finale against the Packers, Stafford recorded his 3,000th career completion in his 125th career game, becoming the fastest player to reach the milestone in NFL history. The Lions finished with a 9–7 record, but did not qualify for the playoffs.

Stafford finished the season with 4,446 passing yards, 29 touchdowns, and 10 interceptions, his seventh consecutive season with at least 4,000 passing yards, to go along with 29 carries for 98 yards. He led the NFC in passing yards in 2017. Stafford was ranked 31st by his peers for the second consecutive year on the list of the Top 100 NFL Players of 2018.

==== 2018 season ====
Going into the 2018 season, Stafford had a new head coach in Matt Patricia.

During the season opener against the Jets on Monday Night Football, Stafford had 286 passing yards, a touchdown, and four interceptions in the 48–17 loss. He rebounded statistically in the following game against the San Francisco 49ers, passing for 347 yards and three touchdowns during the 30–27 road loss. The Lions got their first win of the season the following week against the eventual Super Bowl champion New England Patriots on Sunday Night Football as Stafford recorded 262 passing yards, two touchdowns, and an interception in the 26–10 victory. Overall, the rest of the season was inconsistent for Stafford and the Lions. He never passed for more than two touchdowns in any game for the rest of the season as the Lions finished with a 6–10 record. One memorable game for the Lions was a 31–0 shutout of their rival, the Packers, with Stafford passing for 266 yards and two touchdowns in the regular-season finale. Overall, Stafford finished with 3,777 passing yards, 21 touchdowns, and 11 interceptions to go along with 25 carries for 71 yards.

==== 2019 season ====
During the season-opener on the road against the Cardinals, Stafford threw for 385 yards and three touchdowns in the 27–27 tie game. Stafford helped lead the Lions to consecutive victories over the next two games against the Los Angeles Chargers and Eagles. The Lions dropped consecutive games against the eventual Super Bowl champion Chiefs in Week 4 and Packers in Week 6. During Week 7 against the Vikings, Stafford threw for 364 yards, four touchdowns, and an interception in the 42–30 loss. He also reached 40,000 passing yards in his 147th career game, becoming the fastest quarterback to the reach the milestone.

During Week 10 against the Bears, Stafford missed his first game since 2010, ending his streak of 136 consecutive regular-season starts. Stafford's streak was the sixth-longest for a quarterback in league history. It was eventually revealed that he was diagnosed with non-displaced fractures in his upper thoracic spine, causing Stafford to miss more time than usual. On December 18, 2019, he was placed on injured reserve after missing the previous six games and the Lions missing the playoffs for the third consecutive season. At the time of his shutdown, Stafford was well on pace for an impressive statistical season. He had passed for 2,499 yards, 19 touchdowns, and five interceptions in eight games and starts.

==== 2020 season: Final season in Detroit ====
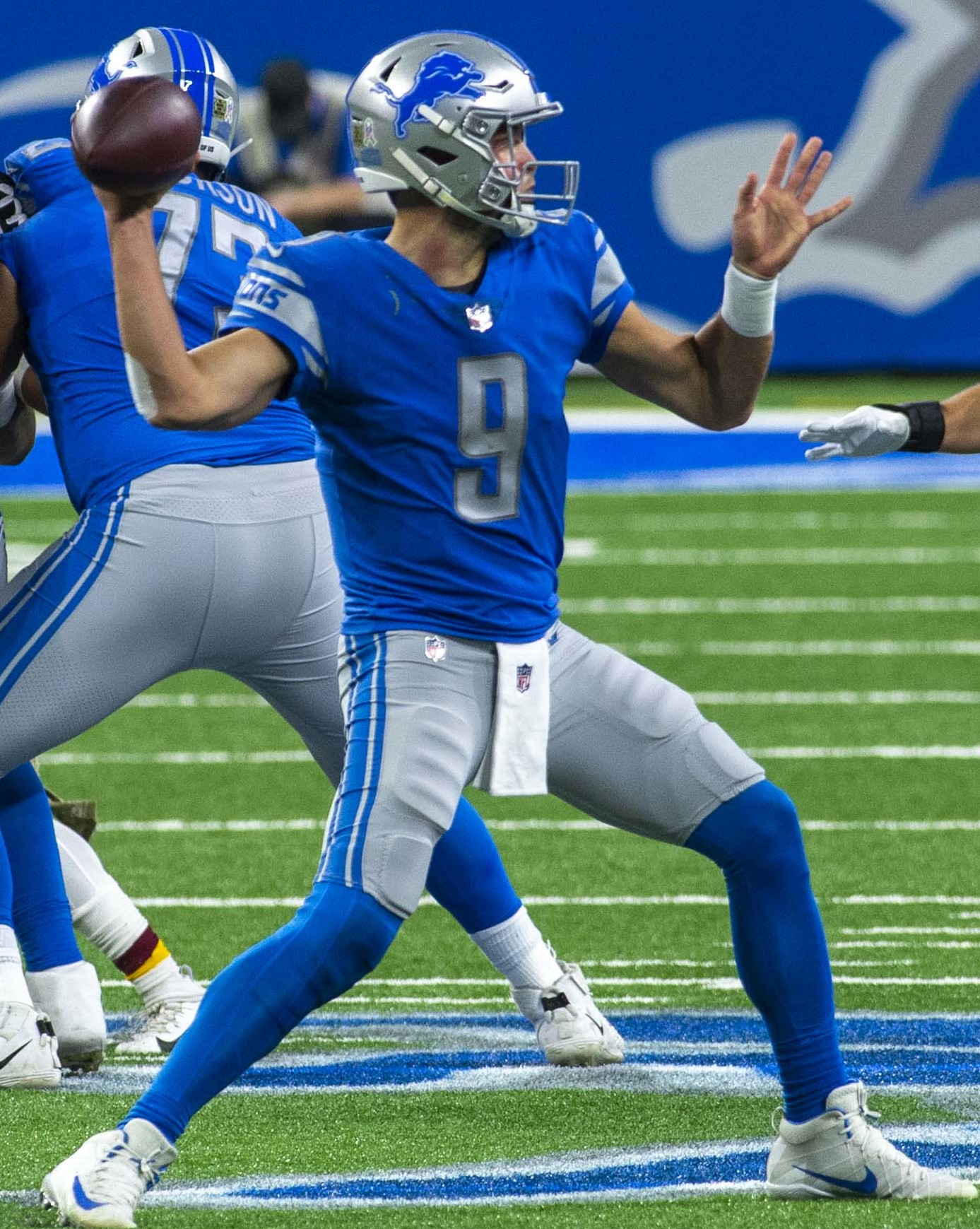
Stafford in 2020

At the start of training camp, Stafford was temporarily on the reserve/COVID-19 list due to a false-positive test.

Stafford made his return from injury in the season-opener against the Bears, passing for 297 yards, a touchdown, and an interception during the 27–23 loss. Two weeks later against the Cardinals, Stafford had 270 passing yards and two touchdowns in the 26–23 victory. This was the Lions' first win since October 27, 2019. During Week 7 against the Atlanta Falcons, Stafford threw for 340 yards and the game winning touchdown to tight end T. J. Hockenson with no time left on the clock in the narrow 23–22 road victory. In the next game against the Colts, Stafford threw for 336 yards, three touchdowns, and an interception returned for a touchdown in the 41–21 loss.

On November 4, 2020, Stafford was placed on the reserve/COVID-19 list again after being a high-risk close contact with a non-team person who tested positive for COVID-19. Three days later, Stafford was removed from the COVID-19 list after he came back negative for the virus and was cleared for the Lions' Week 9 matchup against the Vikings. Stafford threw for 211 yards, a touchdown, and two interceptions before leaving the eventual 34–20 road loss in the fourth quarter and was evaluated for a concussion. He returned from injury in the next game against the Washington Football Team and threw for 276 yards and three touchdowns during the 30–27 victory. Three weeks later against the Bears, he had 402 passing yards, three touchdowns, and an interception in the 34–30 road victory. During Week 16 against the eventual Super Bowl champion Buccaneers, Stafford was forced to leave the game in the first quarter of the 47–7 loss due to an ankle injury and did not return. In the regular-season finale against the Vikings, Stafford threw for 293 yards, three touchdowns, and an interception during the narrow 37–35 loss, which would be his final game as a Lion.

Overall, in the 2020 season, Stafford started all 16 games and finished with 4,084 passing yards, 26 touchdowns, and 10 interceptions to go along with 29 carries for 112 yards.

=== Los Angeles Rams ===
==== 2021 season: Super Bowl LVI ====
On March 18, 2021, Stafford was traded to the Los Angeles Rams in a package involving Jared Goff, a 2021 third-round pick and two first-round picks in 2022 and 2023.

Stafford made his Rams debut during Sunday Night Football against the Bears and finished the 34–14 victory with 321 passing yards and three touchdowns with a career-best 156.1 passer rating. Stafford was named NFC Offensive Player of the Week for the first time since the 2009 season for his performance. In the next game against the Colts, Stafford had 278 passing yards, two touchdowns, and an interception during the 27–24 road victory. The following week against the Buccaneers, Stafford threw for 343 yards, and four touchdowns in the 34–24 victory. He earned his second NFC Offensive Player of the Week award of the season for his performance.

During a Week 5 26–17 road victory over the Seahawks on Thursday Night Football, Stafford threw for 365 yards, a touchdown, and an interception despite injuring his finger. In the next game against the Giants, Stafford completed 22-of-28 passes for 251 yards, four touchdowns, and an interception during the 38–11 road victory. The following week against his former team, the Detroit Lions, Stafford had 334 passing yards and three touchdowns in the 28–19 victory.

During Week 8 against the Houston Texans, Stafford had 305 passing yards and three touchdowns in the 38–22 road victory. In the next game against the Titans on Sunday Night Football, he threw for 294 yards, a touchdown, and two interceptions during the 28–16 loss. Following a Week 11 bye, the Rams went on the road to face the Packers. Stafford finished the 36–28 road loss with 302 passing yards, three touchdowns, and an interception.

Starting in Week 13, Stafford helped lead the Rams to a five-game winning streak to aid in playoff positioning. Despite losing to the 49ers 27–24 in overtime during the regular-season finale, the Rams finished atop the NFC West with a 12–5 record in Stafford's first season with the team. Stafford set franchise records for pass completions, pass attempts, and passing yards and tied Kurt Warner's mark for passing touchdowns in a single season. Stafford threw for 4,886 yards and 41 touchdowns, but also an NFL-leading 17 interceptions thrown.

In the Wild Card Round of the playoffs, Stafford earned the first postseason victory of his career in his fourth attempt with a 34–11 victory over the Cardinals, throwing for 202 yards and two touchdowns, along with 22 rushing yards and scoring a rushing touchdown for the first time since 2016. In Stafford's first career Divisional Round appearance, he threw for 366 yards and two touchdowns and rushed for a touchdown during a 30–27 road victory over the defending champion Tampa Bay Buccaneers. With the Rams' having squandered a 27–3 lead to allow a 27–27 tie game with the Buccaneers, Stafford completed two passes to wide receiver Cooper Kupp for 64 yards, including a 44-yard shot down the field to set up the game-winning field goal. Playing in the NFC Championship Game for the first time in his career, Stafford and the Rams defeated the 49ers by a score of 20–17. Despite being down 17–7 heading into the fourth quarter, Stafford managed to drive his team downfield culminating in a touchdown to Kupp, which cut the deficit to 17–14. Two subsequent drives ended in field goals, with the Rams taking the lead with 1:46 to go in the fourth quarter. The game was sealed when Jimmy Garoppolo threw an interception to linebacker Travin Howard while being pressured by Aaron Donald. The victory qualified the Rams for Super Bowl LVI, to be played in the Rams' home stadium, SoFi Stadium. Stafford completed 31-of-45 passes for 337 yards, two touchdowns, and an interception in the game. During the Super Bowl against the Cincinnati Bengals, the Rams came away victorious on their home field with a final score of 23–20. Scoring started early in the first quarter thanks to a long drive that culminated in a Odell Beckham Jr. touchdown reception. The Bengals managed a field goal to make the score 7–3. Stafford then tossed another touchdown to wide receiver Cooper Kupp on the next possession to extend the lead to 13–3. However, on the first play of the second half, Cincinnati retook the lead, 17–13. After field goals by both teams, the Rams trailed 20–16 in the fourth quarter. Stafford orchestrated a drive in the final minutes that ended with another touchdown pass to Kupp to regain the lead 23–20. Overall, Stafford completed 26-of-40 passes for 283 yards, three touchdowns, and two interceptions as he earned his first championship ring in his first season with the Rams.

Stafford passed for the second-most yards in a single postseason with 1,188. He became the first quarterback since Eli Manning to lead a fourth-quarter comeback in a Conference Championship and a Super Bowl in the same playoff season. Stafford became the first player in NFL history to pass for at least 6,000 yards and 50 touchdowns in the regular season and postseason combined all while leading a team to a Super Bowl victory in the same season. He was ranked 27th by his fellow players on the NFL Top 100 Players of 2022.

==== 2022 season ====
On March 19, 2022, Stafford signed a four-year, $160 million extension with the Rams. During the offseason, he underwent an elbow procedure on his right elbow after experiencing pain throughout the previous season.

During the NFL Kickoff Game against the Buffalo Bills, Stafford threw for 240 yards and a touchdown, but threw three interceptions and was sacked seven times in the 31–10 loss. In the game, Stafford became the 12th quarterback in NFL history to reach 50,000 career passing yards. He tied Drew Brees as the fastest quarterback in NFL history to reach the mark in terms of games played to reach the mark with 183. During Week 5 against the Cowboys, Stafford completed 28 passes of 42 attempts for 308 passing yards, threw a touchdown pass and an interception in the 22–10 loss.

Stafford was put in concussion protocol following the Rams' Week 9 16–13 road loss to the Buccaneers, where he missed the Week 10 matchup against the Cardinals. The Cardinals game marked Stafford's first game as a Ram where he would not play. Stafford returned in week 11 against the Saints, where he threw for 159 yards and two touchdowns, but left the eventual 27–20 loss in the third quarter after suffering a concussion. Following the Rams' Week 13 loss to the Seahawks, head coach Sean McVay revealed that Stafford suffered a spinal cord contusion which would end his season. Stafford was placed on injured reserve on December 5, 2022.

In nine games, Stafford finished with 2,087 passing yards, 10 touchdowns, and eight interceptions to go along with nine rushing yards and a touchdown. The Rams went 3–6 in the games he played, contributing to a disappointing 5–12 season. The Rams' 12 losses marked the most in NFL history for a defending Super Bowl champion.

==== 2023 season ====
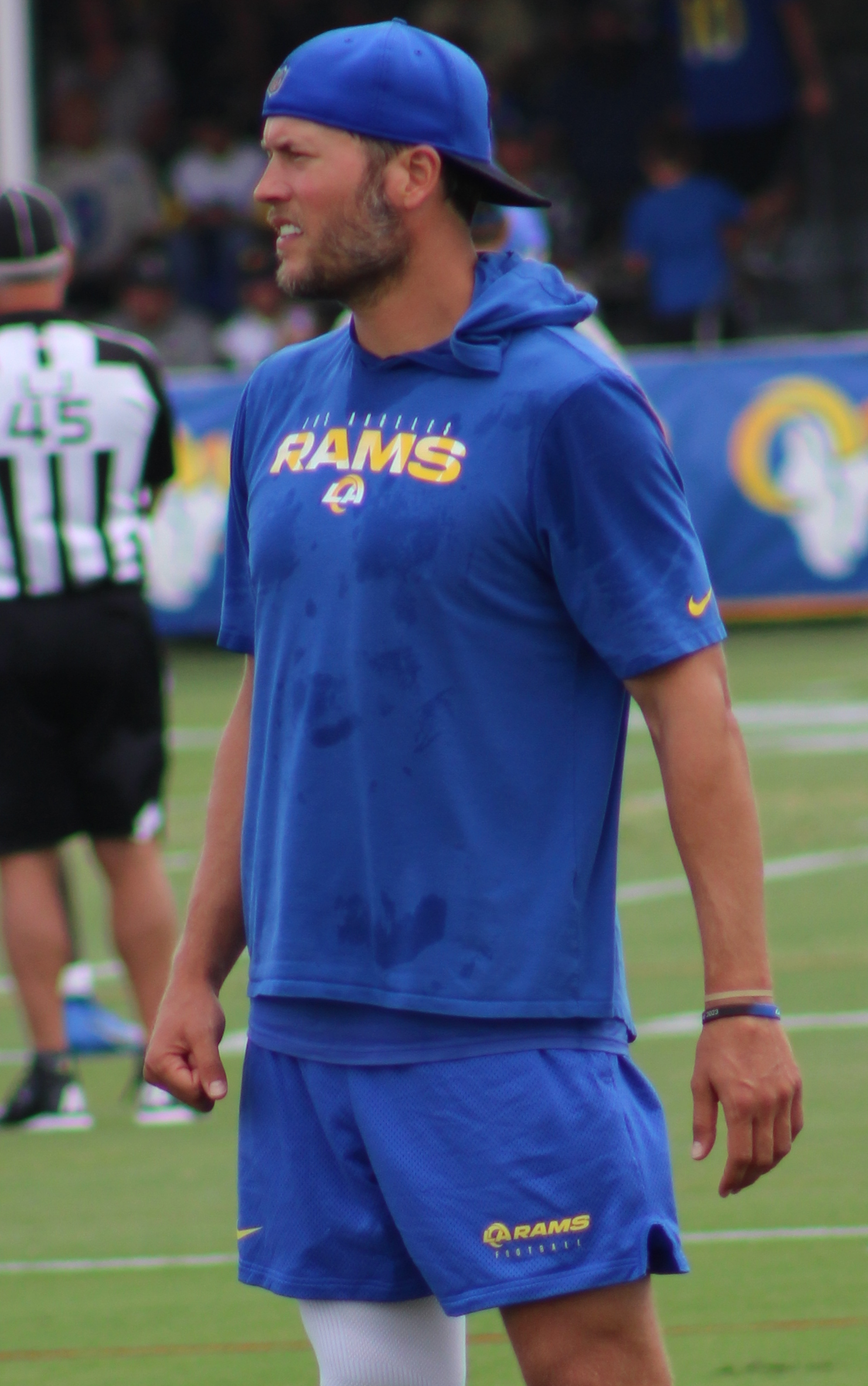
Stafford in 2023

Stafford returned as the Rams starting quarterback in 2023 after speculations that he might retire due to the injuries he sustained in 2022.

During the season-opener against the Seahawks, Stafford completed 24-of-38 passes for 334 yards in the 30–13 road victory. Three weeks later against the Colts, Stafford passed for 319 yards and threw a game-winning touchdown to rookie wide receiver Puka Nacua in the 29–23 overtime road victory.

During Week 8 against the Cowboys, Stafford threw for 162 yards and a touchdown but also threw a pick-six to Cowboys cornerback DaRon Bland in the 43–20 road loss. Stafford exited the game during the third quarter after injuring his right thumb on a two-point conversion pass from Tutu Atwell, and was replaced at quarterback by Brett Rypien. Stafford was later diagnosed with a sprained UCL and would miss the next game against the Packers.

Stafford returned as starter in Week 11 against the Seahawks and threw for 190 yards, a touchdown, and an interception each during a narrow 17–16 victory. In the next game the Cardinals, he had 229 passing yards, a season-high four touchdowns, and an interception during the 37–14 road victory. Between Weeks 12 and 14, Stafford threw a total of 10 touchdowns and one interception in a three-game stretch after starting out the season throwing for nine touchdowns and eight interceptions.

Stafford finished the regular season 3,965 passing yards, 24 touchdowns, and 11 interceptions to go along 21 carries for 65 yards. The Rams finished with a 10–7 record and clinched a Wild Card spot in the playoffs. Stafford was selected to his second Pro Bowl as a reserve for the NFC.

In the Wild Card Round, Stafford and the Rams faced his former team, the Lions. The game marked the first time Stafford returned to Detroit since being traded to Los Angeles. He finished the narrow 24–23 loss completing 25-of-36 passes for 367 yards and two touchdowns as Lions got their first playoff win in 32 seasons. Stafford was ranked 42nd by his fellow players on the NFL Top 100 Players of 2024.

==== 2024 season ====
Stafford and the Rams opened the season in Detroit in a rematch of last year's Wild Card game, with Stafford completing 34-of-49 passes for 317 yards, a touchdown, and an interception during the 26–20 overtime road loss. Following a blowout loss to the Cardinals to drop to 0–2 and injuries to star receivers Puka Nacua and Cooper Kupp, Stafford rallied the Rams from a 10-point fourth-quarter deficit in Week 3 against the 49ers to win 27–24. During a Week 4 loss against the Bears, Stafford passed Eli Manning for 10th in the all-time passing yards list.

With the return of wide receivers Kupp and Nacua in Week 8 against the Vikings, Stafford had a standout game, passing for 279 yards, four touchdowns, and an interception during the 30–20 victory. Three weeks later against the Patriots, he had 295 passing yards and four touchdowns in the 28–22 road victory.

Stafford finished the 2024 season with 3,762 passing yards, 20 touchdowns, and eight interceptions as he helped lead the Rams to a playoff berth. In the Wild Card Round against the Vikings, Stafford completed 19-of-27 passes for 209 yards and two touchdowns during the 27–9 victory. During the Divisional Round against the Eagles, he threw for 324 yards and two touchdowns but had two fumbles, including one lost, in the 28–22 road loss. He was ranked 59th by his fellow players on the NFL Top 100 Players of 2025.

==== 2025 season: MVP season ====
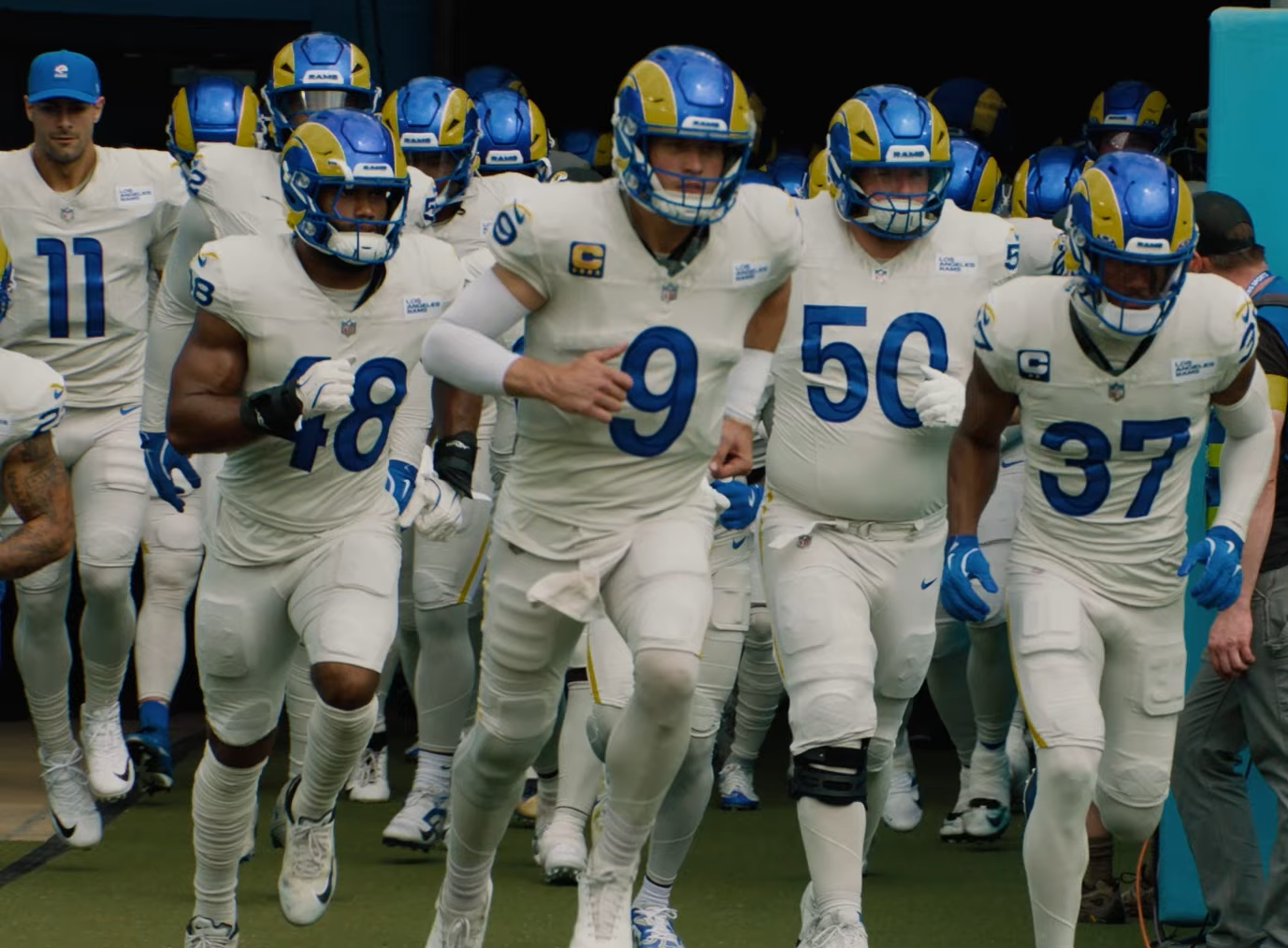
Stafford (#9) in 2025

After being given permission to speak with other teams, Stafford had discussions with the New York Giants and Las Vegas Raiders before deciding to remain with the Rams and agreeing to a restructured contract on February 28, 2025. An aggravated disc in his back caused Stafford to miss most of training camp and there was concern within the Rams organization as to whether his condition would affect him during the season.

During the season-opening 14–9 victory over the Houston Texans, Stafford completed 21 of 29 passes for 245 yards and a touchdown while also becoming the tenth quarterback in NFL history to reach 60,000 career passing yards. Beginning with a 375-yard, three-touchdown performance (during which he threw an 88-yard score to wide receiver Tutu Atwell, the longest touchdown pass of Stafford's career) during a 27–20 victory over the Colts in Week 4, Stafford went eight straight games without throwing an interception and threw 28 touchdown passes in that span. During Week 6 against the Baltimore Ravens, Stafford threw for just 181 yards in the 17–3 road victory, but the yardage total was enough for him to surpass Dan Marino for ninth in NFL career passing yards. In the next game against the Jacksonville Jaguars in London, Stafford threw for 182 yards and tied a career-high with five passing touchdowns during the 35–7 victory.

Stafford's streak of games without an interception ended in Week 13 during a 31–28 loss at the Carolina Panthers, but his 243 passing yards on the day lifted him above Matt Ryan into the eighth spot on the NFL career passing yards list. Stafford was named NFC Offensive Player of the Month for November. He threw for 457 yards, which is his most with the Rams, and three touchdowns in the narrow 38–37 overtime road loss to the Seattle Seahawks in Week 16. The performance also passed Philip Rivers for seventh place all-time in passing yards. In the next game against the Atlanta Falcons, Stafford had 269 passing yards during the 27–24 road loss, with the yardage total moving him past Ben Roethlisberger for the sixth-most passing yards in NFL history, and his two touchdown passes gave him 42 for the season, breaking his own personal single-season best of 41 set in 2011 with Detroit and equaled in 2021 during his first season in Los Angeles. During the regular season finale, Stafford threw for 259 yards and four touchdowns in the 37–20 victory over the Arizona Cardinals and was named NFC Offensive Player of the Week. Following the end of the regular season, Stafford was named NFC Offensive Player of the Month for the second consecutive month covering December/January.

In finishing with 4,707 passing yards and a franchise-record 46 touchdown passes for the regular season, Stafford led the NFL in both categories for the first time in his career. Stafford finished with a career-high 109.2 passer rating for the season. He was named to the Pro Bowl for the third time in his career, and was named to an Associated Press first team All-Pro Quarterback, the first All-Pro honor of his career.

During the Wild Card Round against the Carolina Panthers, Stafford completed 24-of-42 passes for 304 yards, three touchdowns, and an interception as he rallied the Rams to a 34–31 road victory, his fourth playoff comeback victory since being traded to Los Angeles. In the Divisional Round against the #2-seed Chicago Bears, Stafford had 258 passing yards during the 20–17 overtime road victory, sending the Rams to the NFC Championship Game. However, despite Stafford going 22-for-35 for 374 yards and three touchdowns, the Rams lost on the road 31–27. On February 5, 2026, Stafford was named 2026 Most Valuable Player at the 15th NFL Honors, and concluded his acceptance speech by declaring that he would return to the Rams for the 2026 season. Stafford was ranked fourth by his fellow players on the NFL Top 100 Players of 2026.

==== 2026 season ====
On May 21, 2026, Stafford signed a one-year, $55 million contract extension with the Rams.

== Career statistics ==
Legend
	AP NFL MVP
	Won the Super Bowl
	Led the league
**Bold**	Career high

=== NFL ===
==== Regular season ====
Year	Team	Games			Passing									Rushing					Sacks		Fumbles	
Year	Team	GP	GS	Record	Cmp	Att	Pct	Yds	Y/A	Lng	TD	Int	Rtg	Att	Yds	Avg	Lng	TD	Sck	SckY	Fum	Lost
2009	DET	10	10	2–8	201	377	53.3	2,267	6.0	75	13	**20**	61.0	20	108	5.4	21	2	24	169	4	1
2010	DET	3	3	1–2	57	96	59.4	535	5.6	36	6	1	91.3	4	11	2.8	9	1	4	36	2	1
2011	DET	16	16	10–6	421	663	63.5	**5,038**	7.6	73	41	16	97.2	22	78	3.5	22	0	36	257	5	1
2012	DET	16	16	4–12	**435**	**727**	59.8	4,967	6.8	57	20	17	79.8	35	126	3.6	11	**4**	29	212	6	4
2013	DET	16	16	7–9	371	634	58.5	4,650	7.3	87	29	19	84.2	37	69	1.9	14	2	23	168	**12**	4
2014	DET	16	16	11–5	363	602	60.3	4,257	7.1	73	22	12	85.7	43	93	2.2	18	2	45	254	8	3
2015	DET	16	16	7–9	398	592	67.2	4,262	7.2	57	32	13	97.0	**44**	159	3.6	18	1	44	251	4	2
2016	DET	16	16	9–7	388	594	65.3	4,327	7.3	73	24	10	93.3	37	**207**	**5.6**	**24**	2	37	216	3	2
2017	DET	16	16	9–7	371	565	65.7	4,446	7.9	71	29	10	99.3	29	98	3.4	15	0	**47**	**287**	11	**7**
2018	DET	16	16	6–10	367	555	66.1	3,777	6.8	67	21	11	89.9	25	71	2.8	10	0	40	255	6	4
2019	DET	8	8	3–4–1	187	291	64.3	2,499	**8.6**	66	19	5	106.0	20	66	3.3	12	0	18	137	5	3
2020	DET	16	16	5–11	339	528	64.2	4,084	7.7	73	26	10	96.3	29	112	3.9	17	0	38	254	2	1
2021	LAR	17	17	**12–5**	404	601	67.2	4,886	8.1	79	41	17	102.9	32	43	1.3	12	0	30	243	5	2
2022	LAR	9	9	3–6	206	303	**68.0**	2,087	6.9	75	10	8	87.4	13	9	0.7	4	1	29	208	5	3
2023	LAR	15	15	9–6	326	521	62.6	3,965	7.6	80	24	11	92.5	21	65	3.1	9	0	30	205	0	0
2024	LAR	16	16	10–6	340	517	65.8	3,762	7.3	69	20	8	93.7	30	41	1.4	15	0	28	213	6	2
2025	LAR	17	17	**12–5**	388	597	65.0	4,707	7.9	**88**	**46**	8	**109.2**	29	1	0.0	6	0	23	150	7	3
2026	LAR	10	10	6–4	248	372	66.7	2,623	7.1	64	19	10	92.8	17	17	1.0	10	0	15	112	1	0
Career		249	249	126–122–1	5,810	9,135	63.6	67,139	7.3	88	442	206	92.4	487	1,374	2.8	24	15	540	3,627	93	43

==== Postseason ====
Year	Team	Games			Passing									Rushing					Sacks		Fumbles	
Year	Team	GP	GS	Record	Cmp	Att	Pct	Yds	Y/A	Lng	TD	Int	Rtg	Att	Yds	Avg	Lng	TD	Sck	SckY	Fum	Lost
2011	DET	1	1	0–1	28	43	65.1	380	8.8	42	3	2	97.0	2	1	0.5	1	1	0	0	0	0
2014	DET	1	1	0–1	28	42	66.7	323	7.7	51	1	1	87.7	1	9	**9.0**	9	0	3	16	2	**2**
2016	DET	1	1	0–1	18	32	56.3	205	6.4	30	0	0	75.7	3	15	5.0	11	0	3	23	0	0
2021	LAR	4	4	**4–0**	**98**	**140**	**70.0**	**1,188**	8.5	**70**	**9**	**3**	108.3	**18**	**42**	2.3	**14**	**2**	**7**	42	0	0
2023	LAR	1	1	0–1	25	36	69.4	367	**10.2**	50	2	0	**120.9**	0	0	0.0	0	0	2	10	0	0
2024	LAR	2	2	1–1	45	71	63.4	533	7.5	48	4	0	105.0	4	4	1.0	5	0	**7**	40	2	1
2025	LAR	3	3	2–1	66	119	55.5	936	7.9	44	6 (Note: Tied with Drake Maye.)	1	94.4	5	15	3.0	13	0	6	**47**	**3**	0
Career		13	13	7–6	308	483	63.8	3,932	8.1	70	25	7	100.4	33	86	2.6	14	3	28	178	7	3

=== College ===
Season	Team	Games			Passing								Rushing			
Season	Team	GP	GS	Record	Cmp	Att	Pct	Yds	Avg	TD	Int	Rtg	Att	Yds	Avg	TD
2006	Georgia	13	8	6–2	135	256	52.7	1,749	6.8	7	**13**	109.0	47	**191**	**4.1**	**3**
2007	Georgia	13	13	**11–2**	194	348	55.7	2,523	7.3	19	10	128.9	39	−18	−0.5	2
2008	Georgia	13	13	10–3	**235**	**383**	**61.4**	**3,459**	**9.0**	**25**	10	**153.5**	**55**	40	0.7	1
Total		39	34	27–7	564	987	57.1	7,731	7.8	51	33	133.3	141	207	1.5	6

- Stafford's 25 touchdown passes in 2008 broke the previous Georgia record of 24, set by D. J. Shockley (2005) and Eric Zeier (1993, 1994).
- Stafford's 3,459 yards passing in 2008 were second-most in Georgia history, surpassed only by Zeier's 3,525 yards in 1993.

== Career highlights ==
=== Awards and honors ===
NFL

- Super Bowl champion (LVI)
- AP NFL Most Valuable Player (2025)
- PFWA NFL MVP (2025)
- NFL Comeback Player of the Year (2011)
- First-Team All-Pro (2025)
- 3× Pro Bowl (2014, 2023, 2025)
- Pro Bowl Offensive MVP (2014)
- Detroit Lions All-Time Team
- Ranked No. 41 in the NFL Top 100 Players of 2012
- Ranked No. 76 in the NFL Top 100 Players of 2013
- Ranked No. 100 in the NFL Top 100 Players of 2014
- Ranked No. 31 in the NFL Top 100 Players of 2017
- Ranked No. 31 in the NFL Top 100 Players of 2018
- Ranked No. 27 in the NFL Top 100 Players of 2022
- Ranked No. 42 in the NFL Top 100 Players of 2024
- Ranked No. 59 in the NFL Top 100 Players of 2025
- Ranked No. 4 in the NFL Top 100 Players of 2026
- 2× FedEx Air Player of the Week: Week 2 (2011), Week 11 (2011)
- 2× NFC Offensive Player of the Month: November (2025), December/January (2025)
- 4× NFC Offensive Player of the Week: Week 11 (2009), Week 1 (2021), Week 3 (2021), Week 18 (2025)

College

- First-team All-American (2008)
- Second-team All-SEC (2008)
- Named SEC Freshman of the Week twice during the 2006 season
- Named to the 2006 SEC Coaches' All-Freshman Team
- Named Offensive MVP of the 2006 Chick-fil-A Bowl
- Named All-America in 2008 by Pro Football Weekly
- MVP of the 2009 Capital One Bowl

=== Records ===
==== NFL records ====
- Most passing touchdowns in a single game by a rookie quarterback: 5 (tied with Ray Buivid, Jameis Winston, Deshaun Watson, Daniel Jones, and C. J. Stroud)
- Youngest quarterback to throw for at least five touchdowns in a single game (21 years, 288 days) (November 22, 2009, against the Cleveland Browns)
- First player in NFL history to complete 60% or more of all passes in each game in a season (2015)
- Most games with at least one touchdown pass in a season: 17 (2021) (tied with Justin Herbert, Patrick Mahomes, and Lamar Jackson)
- Most consecutive touchdowns thrown without an interception: 28
- Most consecutive 350+ yards passing games: 4 (2011–2012, tied with Drew Brees)
- Most passing yards thrown for in a single game without a touchdown pass: (443, December 22, 2012, against the Atlanta Falcons)
- Most pass attempts per game, season: 45.44 (2012)
- Most games with 40+ pass attempts in a season: 13 (2012)
- Fastest player to reach 35,000 career passing yards (126 games played)
- Fastest player to reach 40,000 career passing yards (147 games played)
- Fastest player to reach 45,000 career passing yards (165 games played)
- Fastest player to reach 50,000 career passing yards (183 games played, tied with Drew Brees)
- Fastest player to reach 3,000 completions (125 games played)
- Most fourth-quarter comebacks in a season: 8 (2016)
- Most game-winning drives in a single season: 8 (2016)

==== Detroit Lions franchise records ====
- Most career pass completions – 3,898 (2009–2020)
- Most passing completions in a single season – 435 (2012)
- Most career pass attempts – 6,224 (2009–2020)
- Most pass attempts in a single season – 727 (2012)
- Most career interceptions – 144
- Most passing attempts in a game – 63 (November 13, 2011, against the Chicago Bears)
- Highest career completion percentage – 62.6% (2009–2020)
- Highest completion percentage in a single season – 67.2% (2015)(tied with Jared Goff (2021))
- Highest completion percentage in a game – 88.0% (December 21, 2015, vs. New Orleans Saints)
- Most career passing yards – 45,109 (2009–2020)
- Most passing yards in a single season – 5,038 (2011)
- Most passing yards in a game – 520 (January 1, 2012, vs. Green Bay Packers)
- Most career 4,000 passing yard seasons – 8
- Most consecutive seasons with 4,000 passing yards – 7 (2011–2017)
- Most career games with 400+ passing yards – 10 (2009–2020)
- Most career games with 300+ passing yards – 49 (2009–2020)
- Most games with 300+ passing yards in a single season – 8 (2011 and 2012)
- Most passing touchdowns in a single season – 41 (2011)
- Most passing touchdowns in a game – 5 (tied with Gary Danielson)
- Most career passing touchdowns – 282 (2009–2020)
- Most games in a season with at least one passing touchdown – 16 (2011)
- Lowest career interception percentage – 2.3% (2009–2020)
- Most career yards per game – 273.4 (2009–2020)
- Most yards per game in a single season – 314.9 (2011)
- Highest career passer rating – 89.9 (2009–2020)
- Highest passer rating in a single season – 106.0 (2017)
- Most career fourth quarter comeback wins – 31
- Most fourth-quarter comeback wins in a single season – 8 (2016) (NFL record)
- Most career game-winning drives – 38
- Most game-winning drives in a single season – 8 (2016) (NFL record)
- Most consecutive completed pass attempts in a game – 14 (December 4, 2016, vs. New Orleans Saints)
- Most yards per pass attempts, career (minimum 1,500 attempts) 7.2 (tied with Bobby Layne)
- Most wins as a starting quarterback, career: 74
- Most losses as a starting quarterback, career: 90
- Most wins as a starting quarterback, single-season: 11 (2014) (tied with Milt Plum)

==== Los Angeles Rams franchise records ====
- Most touchdown passes in a single season: 46 (2025)
- Most passing yards in a single season: 4,886 (2021)
- Most pass completions in a single season: 404 (2021)

== Personal life ==
At Georgia, Stafford met cheerleader Kelly Hall, the sister of former NFL player and current New York Giants assistant quarterbacks coach Chad Hall. They got married on April 4, 2015, and have four daughters. In April 2019, Kelly Stafford stated on Instagram that she had a brain tumor. Kelly underwent a 12-hour surgery on April 17. Stafford took time off from being with the Lions, as training camp started up shortly after Kelly's surgery.

In 2015, Stafford donated $1 million to the S.A.Y. Detroit Play Center. Three years later, Stafford was the Lions' Walter Payton Man of the Year nominee. Prior to the 2020 NFL season, the Stafford family donated $1.5 million to the University of Georgia. The donation funded social justice initiatives and scholarships for needy students. Around 2021, the Stafford family donated $1 million with the purpose of funding an educational center in Detroit after the couple had left for Los Angeles.

Stafford is the godfather of Dylan Raiola; Dylan is the son of Dominic Raiola, Stafford's former teammate on the Detroit Lions. Dylan Raiola has been the starting quarterback for both the Nebraska Cornhuskers and the Oregon Ducks.

In 2026, Stafford made a cameo appearance in Taylor Swift’s music video "Patient Zero".

== See also ==
- List of 500-yard passing games in the National Football League
- List of NFL quarterbacks with 5,000 passing yards in a season
- List of first overall National Football League draft picks
- List of most consecutive starts by a National Football League quarterback
- List of National Football League career passing completions leaders
- List of National Football League career passing touchdowns leaders
- List of National Football League career passing yards leaders
- List of National Football League career quarterback wins leaders
- List of Super Bowl starting quarterbacks
- List of Detroit Lions starting quarterbacks
- List of Los Angeles Rams starting quarterbacks
