= AP NFL Comeback Player of the Year =

American football award given by the Associated Press

- Awarded for: Comeback player of the year in the National Football League
- Presented by: Associated Press

History
- First award: 1963; 1998
- Most wins: Chad Pennington and Joe Burrow (2)
- Most recent: Christian McCaffrey

The AP NFL Comeback Player of the Year (CBPOY) is an annual award presented by the Associated Press (AP) to a player in the National Football League (NFL). While the criteria for the award is imprecise, it is typically given to a player who overcomes adversity to return to play. The winner is selected by a nationwide panel of media personnel. Since 2011, the award has been presented at the NFL Honors ceremony held in the days leading up to the Super Bowl. Beginning with the 2024 season, the criteria for the award was changed to emphasize players coming back from "illness, physical injury, or other circumstances that led him to miss playing time the previous season", as opposed to players having resurgent performances or "coming back from sucking".

The AP first recognized an NFL comeback player of the year from 1963 to 1966, but these players are typically not included in overall lists of winners. The AP did not give the award again until the 1998 season. Only two players have received the award more than once since the AFL–NFL merger: quarterbacks Chad Pennington (2006 and 2008) and Joe Burrow (2021 and 2024).

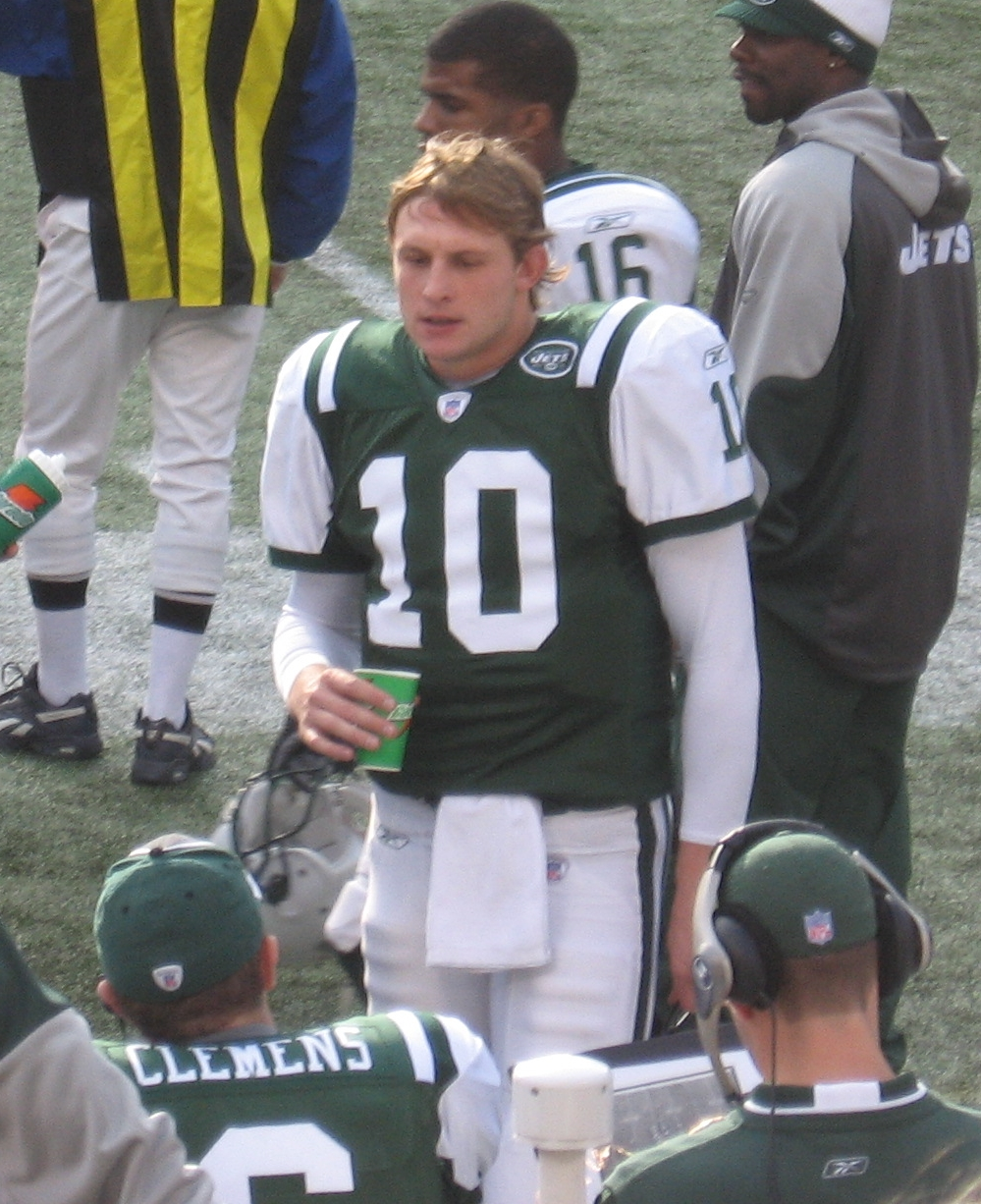
Chad Pennington (pictured) along with Joe Burrow each won two Comeback Player of the Year awards, the most in NFL history.

== Winners ==
=== 1963–1966 ===
NFL				AFL			
Season	Player	Position	Team	Season	Player	Position	Team
1963	Jim Martin	K	Baltimore	1963	Paul Lowe	RB	San Diego
1964	Lenny Moore	RB	Baltimore	1964	Abner Haynes	RB	Kansas City
1965	John Brodie	QB	San Francisco	1965	Paul Lowe	RB	San Diego
1966	Dick Bass	RB	LA Rams	1966	Babe Parilli	QB	Boston

=== 1998–2025 ===
Season	Player	Position	Team
1998	Doug Flutie	QB	Buffalo
1999	Bryant Young	DT	San Francisco
2000	Joe Johnson	DE	New Orleans
2001	Garrison Hearst	RB	San Francisco
2002	Tommy Maddox	QB	Pittsburgh
2003	Jon Kitna	QB	Cincinnati
2004	Drew Brees	QB	San Diego
2005	Tedy Bruschi	LB	New England
2005	Steve Smith Sr.	WR	Carolina
2006	Chad Pennington	QB	NY Jets
2007	Greg Ellis	DE	Dallas
2008	Chad Pennington (2)	QB	Miami
2009	Tom Brady	QB	New England
2010	Michael Vick	QB	Philadelphia
2011	Matthew Stafford	QB	Detroit
2012	Peyton Manning	QB	Denver
2013	Philip Rivers	QB	San Diego
2014	Rob Gronkowski	TE	New England
2015	Eric Berry	S	Kansas City
2016	Jordy Nelson	WR	Green Bay
2017	Keenan Allen	WR	LA Chargers
2018	Andrew Luck	QB	Indianapolis
2019	Ryan Tannehill	QB	Tennessee
2020	Alex Smith	QB	Washington
2021	Joe Burrow	QB	Cincinnati
2022	Geno Smith	QB	Seattle
2023	Joe Flacco	QB	Cleveland
2024	Joe Burrow (2)	QB	Cincinnati
2025	Christian McCaffrey	RB	San Francisco

== Multiple-time winners ==
List of multiple-time winners
Awards	Player	Team(s)	Years
2	Chad Pennington	Miami Dolphins (1) / New York Jets (1)	2006, 2008
2	Joe Burrow	Cincinnati Bengals	2021, 2024

== See also ==
- List of NFL Comeback Player of the Year awards for an overview of similar awards from other organizations
