= Michael Hofmann (disambiguation) =

Michael Hofmann (born 1957) is a German poet and translator.

Michael Hofmann may also refer to:

- Michael Hofmann (sumi-e) (born 1948), American sumi-e / ink wash painter
- Michael Hofmann (footballer, born 1972), German footballer
- Michael Hofmann (footballer, born 1971), Swiss footballer
- Michael Hofmann (politician) (born 1974), German politician

== See also ==
- Michael Hoffman (disambiguation)
- Michael R. Hoffmann, American environmental engineer
- Mike Hoffmann (fl. 1980–2021), American musician
