= Michael Hoffman =

Michael or Mike Hoffman may refer to:

== Sports ==
- Mike Hoffman (ice hockey, born 1963), Canadian ice hockey player (retired), who played for the Hartford Whalers
- Mike Hoffman (ice hockey, born 1980), American ice hockey player (retired), who played in the Toronto Maple Leafs organization
- Mike Hoffman (ice hockey, born 1989), Canadian ice hockey player, in the San Jose Sharks organization
- Moe Hoffman, American soccer player

== Others ==
- Michael Hoffman (congressman) (1787–1848), New York representative
- Michael A. Hoffman (1944–1990), archaeologist
- Michael Hoffman (director) (born 1956), American film director
- Michael A. Hoffman II (born 1957), Holocaust denier

== See also ==
- Michael Hofmann (disambiguation)
- Michael R. Hoffmann, American environmental engineer
- Mike Hoffmann (fl. 1980–2021), American musician
