= Caliendo =

Caliendo is a surname. Notable people with the surname include:

- Frank Caliendo (born 1974), American comedian, actor, and impressionist
- Mike Caliendo (born 1997), American football player
