= PPMS =

PPMS can refer to:

- Primary Progressive Multiple Sclerosis
- Pilgrim Park Middle School, Wisconsin

== See also ==
- PMMS
