= Elm Grove, Wisconsin =

- Village
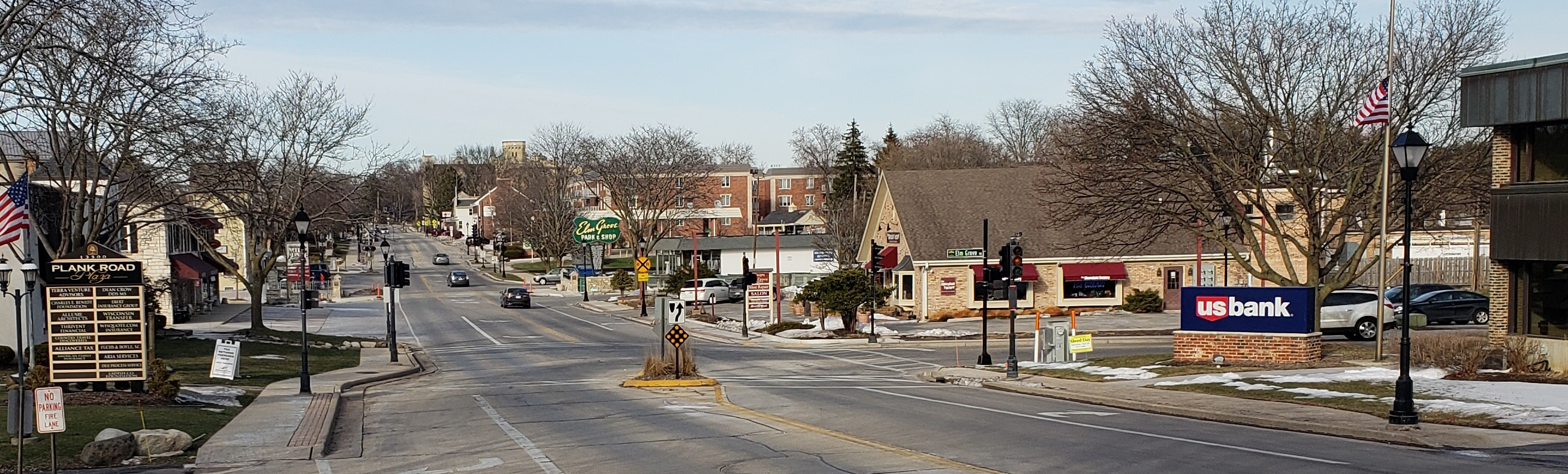
- Downtown Elm Grove

- Location of Elm Grove in Waukesha County, Wisconsin.
- Coordinates: 43°2′52″N 88°5′12″W
- Country: United States
- State: Wisconsin
- County: Waukesha

Area
  - Total: 3.28 sq mi (8.49 km^{2})
  - Land: 3.26 sq mi (8.45 km^{2})
  - Water: 0.019 sq mi (0.05 km^{2})
- Elevation: 748 ft (228 m)

Population (2020)
  - Total: 6,524
  - Density: 1,881.5/sq mi (726.47/km^{2})
- Time zone: UTC-6 (Central (CST))
  - Summer (DST): UTC-5 (CDT)
- FIPS code: 55-23575
- GNIS feature ID: 1564560
- Website: elmgrovewi.org

Elm Grove is a village in Waukesha County, Wisconsin, United States. The population was 6,524 at the 2020 census. Elm Grove was named as America's best suburb by Business Insider in October 2014.

== Geography ==
Elm Grove is located at 43°2′52″N 88°5′12″W (43.047662, -88.086750).

According to the United States Census Bureau, the village has a total area of 3.29 square miles (8.52 km^{2}), of which 3.27 square miles (8.47 km^{2}) is land and 0.02 square miles (0.05 km^{2}) is water.

Elm Grove is surrounded by four major roads, one of which is a U.S. Highway, U.S. Highway 18, or Bluemound Road. The other boundaries are made up of Pilgrim Parkway on the west, North Avenue on the north, and 124th Street on the east. Watertown Plank runs east from Pilgrim Pkwy to 124th Street and acts as the primary retail street.

== Demographics ==
Historical population
| Census | Pop. | Note | %± |
|---|---|---|---|
| 1960 | 4,994 | | — |
| 1970 | 7,201 | | 44.2% |
| 1980 | 6,735 | | −6.5% |
| 1990 | 6,261 | | −7.0% |
| 2000 | 6,249 | | −0.2% |
| 2010 | 5,934 | | −5.0% |
| 2020 | 6,513 | | 9.8% |
U.S. Decennial Census

=== 2010 census ===
At the 2010 census there were 5,934 people, 2,326 households, and 1,682 families living in the village. The population density was 1,814.7 inhabitants per square mile (700.7/km^{2}). There were 2,513 housing units at an average density of 768.5 per square mile (296.7/km^{2}). The racial makeup of the village was 95.4% White, 0.7% African American, 0.1% Native American, 2.5% Asian, 0.1% Pacific Islander, 0.3% from other races, and 1.0% from two or more races. Hispanic or Latino of any race were 2.0%.

Of the 2,326 households 29.4% had children under the age of 18 living with them, 64.5% were married couples living together, 5.9% had a female householder with no husband present, 1.8% had a male householder with no wife present, and 27.7% were non-families. 24.6% of households were one person and 13.9% were one person aged 65 or older. The average household size was 2.49 and the average family size was 2.99.

The median age in the village was 48.5 years. 23.9% of residents were under the age of 18; 4.3% were between the ages of 18 and 24; 15.5% were from 25 to 44; 33.7% were from 45 to 64; and 22.3% were 65 or older. The gender makeup of the village was 45.9% male and 54.1% female.

=== 2000 census ===
At the 2000 census there were 6,249 people, 2,444 households, and 1,784 families living in the village. The population density was 1,918.6 people per square mile (740.1/km^{2}). There were 2,556 housing units at an average density of 784.7 per square mile (302.7/km^{2}). The racial makeup of the village was 97.14% White, 0.43% African American, 0.11% Native American, 1.49% Asian American, 0.08% Pacific Islander, 0.40% from other races, and 0.35% from two or more races. Hispanic or Latino of any race were 1.20%.

Of the 2,444 households 29.7% had children under the age of 18 living with them, 67.6% were married couples living together, 4.3% had a female householder with no husband present, and 27.0% were non-families. 24.7% of households were one person and 12.1% were one person aged 65 or older. The average household size was 2.49 and the average family size was 3.00.

The age distribution was 24.9% under the age of 18, 3.6% from 18 to 24, 20.3% from 25 to 44, 28.6% from 45 to 64, and 22.5% 65 or older. The median age was 46 years. For every 100 females, there were 89.5 males. For every 100 females age 18 and over, there were 86.0 males.

The median household income was $86,212 and the median family income was $108,209. Males had a median income of $94,403 versus $41,017 for females. The per capita income for the village was $48,871. About 2.4% of families and 3.0% of the population were below the poverty line, including 2.3% of those under age 18 and 5.0% of those age 65 or over.

== Government ==
Elm Grove government is headed by a village president and overseen by a board of trustees, the seven members of which are elected to two-year terms. The current village president and head of the board of trustees is Jim Koleski. The current trustees are Tom Castile, Shawn Hillman, Kristina Sayas, John Schindler, Tom Shepard, and Jennifer Stuckert.

The library is the Elm Grove Public Library.

== Education ==
Elm Grove is served by the Elmbrook School District. Students from the village attend Tonawanda or Dixon Elementary School, Pilgrim Park Middle School and Brookfield East and Brookfield Central High Schools, both located in neighboring City of Brookfield.

Parochial schools in the village include Elm Grove Lutheran School (K-8) and St. Mary's Visitation Parish School (K-8).

== See also ==
- List of villages in Wisconsin
