= 2025 NFL season =

American football season

Regular season
- Duration: September 4, 2025 – January 4, 2026

Playoffs
- Start date: January 10, 2026
- AFC Champions: New England Patriots
- NFC Champions: Seattle Seahawks

Super Bowl LX
- Date: February 8, 2026
- Site: Levi's Stadium, Santa Clara, California
- Champions: Seattle Seahawks

Pro Bowl
- Date: February 3, 2026
- Site: Moscone Center, San Francisco

AFC teams: West, North, South, East
NFC teams: West, North, South, East

The 2025 NFL season was the 106th season of the National Football League (NFL). The regular season began on September 4, 2025, with reigning Super Bowl champion Philadelphia defeating Dallas in the NFL Kickoff Game, and ended on January 4, 2026. The playoffs began on January 10, and concluded on February 8 with Super Bowl LX, the league's championship game, in which Seattle defeated New England at Levi's Stadium in Santa Clara, California.

== Player movement ==
The 2025 NFL league year and trading period began on March 12. On March 10, teams were allowed to exercise options for 2025 on players with option clauses in their contracts, submit qualifying offers to their pending restricted free agents, and submit a Minimum Salary Tender to retain exclusive negotiating rights to their players with expiring 2024 contracts and fewer than three accrued seasons of free agent credit. Teams are required to be under the salary cap using the "top 51" definition (in which the 51 highest paid-players on the team's payroll must have a combined salary cap). On March 12, clubs were allowed to contact and begin contract negotiations with players whose contracts had expired and thus became unrestricted free agents. The season's salary cap increase $23.8 million per team for a total of $279.2 million per team.

Positions key
Offense	Defense	Special teams
QB — Quarterback; RB — Running back; FB — Fullback; WR — Wide receiver; TE — Tight end; OL — Offensive lineman; T — Tackle; G — Guard; C — Center	DL — Defensive lineman; DT — Defensive tackle (Note: Includes nose tackle (NT)); DE — Defensive end; EDGE — Edge rusher; LB — Linebacker (Note: Includes middle linebacker (MLB/MIKE), weakside linebacker (WILL), strongside linebacker (SAM), off-ball linebacker, and outside linebacker (OLB)); DB — Defensive back; CB — Cornerback; S — Safety (Note: Includes free safety (FS) and strong safety (SS))	K — Kicker (Note: Also known as a placekicker (PK)); P — Punter; LS — Long snapper; RS — Return specialist (Note: Includes kickoff and punt returners)

=== Free agency ===
Free agency began on March 12, 2025.

- Quarterbacks Sam Darnold (Minnesota to Seattle), Justin Fields (Pittsburgh to New York Jets), Joe Flacco (Indianapolis to Cleveland), Aaron Rodgers (New York Jets to Pittsburgh), and Russell Wilson (Pittsburgh to New York Giants)
- Running backs Nick Chubb (Cleveland to Houston), J. K. Dobbins (Los Angeles Chargers to Denver), Rico Dowdle (Dallas to Carolina), Najee Harris (Pittsburgh to Los Angeles Chargers), and Javonte Williams (Denver to Dallas)
- Wide receivers Davante Adams (New York Jets to Los Angeles Rams), Keenan Allen (Chicago to Los Angeles Chargers), Stefon Diggs (Houston to New England), DeAndre Hopkins (Kansas City to Baltimore), Cooper Kupp (Los Angeles Rams to Seattle), Tyler Lockett (Seattle to Tennessee), and Josh Palmer (Los Angeles Chargers to Buffalo)
- Tight ends Tyler Conklin (New York Jets to Los Angeles Chargers), Evan Engram (Jacksonville to Denver), and Noah Fant (Seattle to Cincinnati)
- Offensive linemen Aaron Banks (San Francisco to Green Bay), Mekhi Becton (Philadelphia to Los Angeles), Drew Dalman (Atlanta to Chicago), Will Fries (Indianapolis to Minnesota), Ryan Kelly (Indianapolis to Minnesota), Patrick Mekari (Baltimore to Jacksonville), Dan Moore (Pittsburgh to Tennessee), and Jaylon Moore (San Francisco to Kansas City)
- Defensive linemen Jonathan Allen (Washington to Minnesota), Joey Bosa (Los Angeles Chargers to Buffalo), Calais Campbell (Miami to Arizona), Maliek Collins (San Francisco to Cleveland), Leonard Floyd (San Francisco to Atlanta), Javon Hargrave (San Francisco to Minnesota), Grady Jarrett (Atlanta to Chicago), DeMarcus Lawrence (Dallas to Seattle), Tershawn Wharton (Kansas City to Carolina), Tedarrell Slaton (Green Bay to Cincinnati), and Milton Williams (Philadelphia to New England)
- Linebackers Dre Greenlaw (San Francisco to Denver), Nate Landman (Atlanta to Los Angeles Rams), Harold Landry (Tennessee to New England), Von Miller (Buffalo to Washington), Haason Reddick (New York Jets to Tampa Bay), Robert Spillane (Las Vegas to New England), Josh Sweat (Philadelphia to Arizona), and Oren Burks (Philadelphia to Cincinnati)
- Defensive backs Paulson Adebo (New Orleans to New York Giants), Jaire Alexander (Green Bay to Baltimore), Camryn Bynum (Minnesota to Indianapolis), Carlton Davis (Detroit to New England), Jevon Holland (Miami to New York Giants), Talanoa Hufanga (San Francisco to Denver), Tre'von Moehrig (Las Vegas to Carolina), D. J. Reed (New York Jets to Detroit), Darius Slay (Philadelphia to Pittsburgh), and Charvarius Ward (San Francisco to Indianapolis)
- Kickers Matt Gay (Indianapolis to Washington) and Joey Slye (New England to Tennessee)
- Punters Riley Dixon (Denver to Tampa Bay), Johnny Hekker (Carolina to Tennessee), and Ryan Stonehouse (Tennessee to Miami)

=== Trades ===
The following notable trades were made during the 2025 league year:

- March 12: San Francisco traded WR Deebo Samuel to Washington in exchange for a 2025 fifth-round selection.
- March 12: Kansas City traded G Joe Thuney to Chicago in exchange for a 2026 fourth-round selection.
- March 12: The Los Angeles Rams traded G Jonah Jackson to Chicago in exchange for a 2025 sixth-round selection.
- March 12: Houston traded OT Laremy Tunsil and a 2025 fourth-round selection to Washington in exchange for 2025 third- and seventh-round selections and 2026 second- and fourth-round selections.
- March 12: Seattle traded WR DK Metcalf and a 2025 sixth-round selection to Pittsburgh in exchange for 2025 second- and seventh-round selections.
- March 12: Philadelphia traded S C. J. Gardner-Johnson and a 2025 sixth-round selection to Houston in exchange for G Kenyon Green and a 2026 fifth-round selection.
- March 13: Seattle traded QB Geno Smith to Las Vegas in exchange for a 2025 third-round selection.
- March 13: Philadelphia traded QB Kenny Pickett to Cleveland in exchange for QB Dorian Thompson-Robinson and a 2025 fifth-round selection.
- May 7: Pittsburgh traded WR George Pickens and a 2027 sixth-round selection to Dallas in exchange for 2026 third-round and 2027 fifth-round selections.
- June 30: Miami traded CB Jalen Ramsey, TE Jonnu Smith, and 2027 seventh-round selection to Pittsburgh in exchange for S Minkah Fitzpatrick and a 2027 fifth-round selection.
- July 1: The New York Giants traded TE Darren Waller and a 2027 seventh-round selection to Miami in exchange for a 2026 sixth-round selection.
- August 5: Las Vegas traded CB Jakorian Bennett to Philadelphia in exchange for DT Thomas Booker.
- August 18: Philadelphia traded TE Harrison Bryant and a 2026 fifth-round selection to Houston in exchange for WR John Metchie III and a 2026 sixth-round selection.
- August 18: New Orleans traded DT Khalen Saunders to Jacksonville in exchange for C Luke Fortner.
- August 20: Denver traded WR Devaughn Vele to New Orleans in exchange for a 2026 fourth-round selection and a 2027 seventh-round selection.
- August 27: Carolina traded WR Adam Thielen, a conditional 2026 seventh-round selection, and a 2027 fifth-round selection to Minnesota in exchange for a 2026 fifth-round selection and a 2027 fourth-round selection.
- August 28: Dallas traded DE Micah Parsons to Green Bay in exchange for DT Kenny Clark and 2026 and 2027 first-round selections.
- October 7: Baltimore traded LB Odafe Oweh and a 2027 seventh-round selection to the Los Angeles Chargers in exchange for S Alohi Gilman and a 2026 fifth-round selection.
- October 8: Cleveland traded CB Greg Newsome II and a 2026 sixth-round selection to Jacksonville in exchange for CB Tyson Campbell and a 2026 seventh-round selection.
- October 29: Philadelphia traded WR John Metchie III and a 2027 sixth-round selection to the New York Jets in exchange for CB Michael Carter II and a 2027 seventh-round selection.
- November 1: Baltimore traded CB Jaire Alexander and a 2027 seventh-round selection to Philadelphia in exchange for a 2026 sixth-round selection.
- November 3: Miami traded LB Jaelan Phillips to Philadelphia in exchange for a 2026 third-round selection.
- November 4: Las Vegas traded WR Jakobi Meyers to Jacksonville in exchange for 2026 fourth- and sixth-round selections.
- November 4: The New York Jets traded CB Sauce Gardner to Indianapolis in exchange for WR Adonai Mitchell and 2026 and 2027 first-round selections.
- November 4: New Orleans traded WR Rashid Shaheed to Seattle in exchange for 2026 fourth- and fifth-round selections.
- November 4: The New York Jets traded DT Quinnen Williams to Dallas in exchange for DT Mazi Smith, a 2026 second-round selection, and a 2027 first-round selection.

=== Retirements ===
Notable retirements

- OT Terron Armstead – Five-time Pro Bowler and one-time second-team All-Pro. Played for New Orleans and Miami during his 12-year career.
- LB Anthony Barr – Four-time Pro Bowler. Played for Minnesota and Dallas during his 10-year career.
- QB Derek Carr – Four-time Pro Bowler. Played for Oakland/Las Vegas and New Orleans during his 11-year career.
- WR Amari Cooper – Five-time Pro Bowler. Played for Oakland, Dallas, Cleveland, and Buffalo during his 10-year career.
- TE Jimmy Graham – Five-time Pro Bowler and two-time All-Pro (one first-team, one second-team). Played for New Orleans, Seattle, Green Bay, and Chicago during his 13-year career.
- WR Julio Jones – Seven-time Pro Bowler and five-time All-Pro (two first-team, three second-team). Played for Atlanta, Tennessee, Tampa Bay, and Philadelphia during his 13-year career.
- LB Shaquille Leonard – Three-time Pro Bowler, four-time All-Pro (three first-team, one second-team), and 2018 Defensive Rookie of the Year. Played for Indianapolis and Philadelphia during his six-year career.
- G Zack Martin – Nine-time Pro Bowler and nine-time All-Pro (seven first-team, two second-team). Played for Dallas during his entire 11-year career.
- S Tyrann Mathieu – Three-time Pro Bowler, four-time All-Pro (three first-team, one second-team), and Super Bowl LIV champion. Played for Arizona, Houston, Kansas City, and New Orleans during his 12-year career.
- LB C. J. Mosley – Five-time Pro Bowler and five-time second-team All-Pro. Played for Baltimore and the New York Jets during his 11-year career.
- OT Jason Peters – Nine-time Pro Bowler, six-time All-Pro (two first-team, four second-team), and Super Bowl LII champion. Played for Buffalo, Philadelphia, Chicago, Dallas, and Seattle during his 21-year career.
- CB Patrick Peterson – Eight-time Pro Bowler and three-time first-team All-Pro. Played for Arizona, Minnesota, and Pittsburgh during his 13-year career.
- C Frank Ragnow – Four-time Pro Bowler and three-time second-team All-Pro. Played for Detroit during his entire seven-year career.
- G Brandon Scherff – Five-time Pro Bowler and one-time first-team All-Pro. Played for Washington and Jacksonville during his 10-year career.
- OT Tyron Smith – Eight-time Pro Bowler and five-time All-Pro (two first-team, three second-team). Played for Dallas and the New York Jets during his 14-year career.
- DT Ndamukong Suh – Five-time Pro Bowler, five-time All-Pro (three first-team, two second-team), and Super Bowl LV champion. Played for Detroit, Miami, the Los Angeles Rams, Tampa Bay, and Philadelphia during his 13-year career.

Other retirements

- Holton Ahlers
- Brian Allen
- David Andrews
- Shaquil Barrett
- Justin Bethel
- Matt Breida
- Jason Cabinda
- Lorenzo Carter
- John Cominsky
- Chris Conley
- Mason Crosby
- Vinny Curry
- Ronald Darby
- Tommy Doyle
- Zach Evans
- Jon Feliciano
- Antoine Green
- Duron Harmon
- Nate Herbig
- Jordan Hicks
- Dallin Holker
- Sam Hubbard
- Micah Hyde
- Kareem Jackson
- Jaleel Johnson
- Charles Leno
- David Mayo
- Rodney McLeod
- Mitch Morse
- Latavius Murray
- Keanu Neal
- Michael Pierce
- Justin Pugh
- Mike Purcell
- Ryan Ramczyk
- Isaac Rochell
- Mohamed Sanu
- Caden Sterns
- Jordan Travis
- Ryan Watts
- Connor Williams
- K'Waun Williams
- Mike Williams

=== Draft ===
The 2025 NFL draft took place at Lambeau Field and its adjacent Titletown District in Green Bay, Wisconsin, on April 24–26. Tennessee, by virtue of having the worst record in 2024, held the first overall selection and selected Miami (FL) quarterback Cam Ward.

== 2025 deaths ==
=== Pro Football Hall of Fame members ===
Kenny Easley
Easley played seven seasons in the NFL as a safety with the Seattle Seahawks, and was inducted into the Hall of Fame in 2017. He was a five-time Pro Bowler, five-time All-Pro (four first-team, one second-team) and NFL Defensive Player of the Year in 1984. He died on November 14, age 66.

Steve McMichael
McMichael played 15 seasons in the NFL as a defensive tackle with the New England Patriots, Chicago Bears, and Green Bay Packers, and was inducted into the Hall of Fame in 2024. He was a two-time Pro Bowler, four-time All-Pro (two first-team, two second-team), and Super Bowl XX champion. He died on April 23, age 67.

Paul Tagliabue
Tagliabue served as the commissioner of the NFL from 1989 to 2006 and was inducted into the Hall of Fame in 2020. He died on November 9, age 84.

=== Active personnel ===
Carol Davis
Davis was co-owner of the Las Vegas Raiders, assuming co-control in 2011 with her son Mark following the death of her husband Al Davis. She died on October 24, age 93.

Jim Irsay
Irsay was the owner, chairman and CEO of the Indianapolis Colts, assuming the position in 1997 following the death of his father Robert Irsay. He won Super Bowl XLI as team owner. He died on May 21, age 65. He was officially replaced by his daughter, Carlie Irsay-Gordon.

Marshawn Kneeland
Kneeland was a defensive end for the Dallas Cowboys for two seasons. He died on November 6, age 24.

Virginia Halas McCaskey
McCaskey was the owner of the Chicago Bears, assuming control in 1983 following the death of her father George Halas. She won Super Bowl XX as team owner. She died on February 6, age 102. She was officially replaced by her son, George Halas McCaskey.

== Rule changes ==
The following rule changes for the 2025 season were approved at the NFL Owners' Meeting on March 30–April 2:

- The kickoff rules approved on a trial basis in 2024 were made permanent, with the below change:

- The receiving team will now receive the ball at its 35-yard line if the kick sails into or beyond the end zone for a touchback (previously this was the 30-yard line). The receiving team will still receive the ball at its 20-yard line on a touchback if the ball bounces into the end zone after first landing in the field of play.

- Both teams will have a chance to possess the ball in overtime, aligning regular season and postseason overtime rules. Unlike in the postseason, regular season overtime will remain limited to 10 minutes.
- Replay rules were expanded, allowing replay officials to advise on-field officials on "specific, objective aspects of a play" and to address game administration issues.
- The "nose-wipe" gesture was added to the list of acts that will draw an unsportsmanlike conduct penalty of 15 yards.
- Virtual line-to-gain measurements powered by Hawk-Eye technology ("virtual measurement system") will be employed instead of the chain crew, who will still be used as a secondary system for first downs.

The following rule change for the 2025 season was approved at the Spring League Meeting on May 20–21:

- Teams can declare an onside kick at any point of a game when trailing (for the 2024 season this could only be done in the fourth quarter) and can line up one yard closer to the opponent. The spot of the kick remains the 35 yard line, and the ball still must go 10 yards or be touched by a member of the receiving team before the kicking team can legally recover.

== Preseason ==
The Detroit Lions and Los Angeles Chargers played in the Pro Football Hall of Fame Game on July 31, with the Chargers beating the Lions 34–7.

== Regular season ==
The season was played over an 18-week schedule which began on September 4. Each of the league's 32 teams played 17 games, with one bye week. The regular season ended on January 4, 2026. All games during the final weekend of the regular season consisted of intra-division games, as it has been since 2010.

Each team played the other three teams in its own division twice, one game against each of the four teams from a division in its own conference, one game against each of the four teams from a division in the other conference, one game against each of the remaining two teams in its conference that finished in the same position in their respective divisions the previous season (e.g., the team that finished fourth in its division would play all three other teams in its conference that also finished fourth in their divisions), and one game against a team in another division in the other conference that also finished in the same position in their respective division the previous season.

The division pairings for 2025 included:

Four intra-conference games
AFC East vs AFC North
AFC South vs AFC West
NFC East vs NFC North
NFC South vs NFC West

Four interconference games
AFC East vs NFC South
AFC North vs NFC North
AFC South vs NFC West
AFC West vs NFC East

Interconference game by 2024 position
NFC East at AFC East
NFC North at AFC West
NFC South at AFC South
NFC West at AFC North

Highlights of the 2025 season included:

- The NFL Kickoff Game: The season began with the Kickoff Game on September 4, 2025, with Dallas at defending Super Bowl LIX champion Philadelphia. Philadelphia won the game.
- The NFL International Series: NFL owners voted in 2023 to increase the number of International Series games to a maximum of eight starting in 2025; seven were scheduled for 2025.

- Kansas City at the Los Angeles Chargers on September 5 at Arena Corinthians in São Paulo, Brazil. Los Angeles won.
- Minnesota at Pittsburgh on September 28 at Croke Park in Dublin. It was the first NFL regular season game held in Ireland; Pittsburgh won.
- Minnesota at Cleveland at Tottenham Hotspur Stadium on October 5 in London. Minnesota won.
- Denver at the New York Jets on October 12 at Tottenham Hotspur Stadium in London. Denver won.
- Los Angeles Rams at Jacksonville on October 19 at Wembley Stadium. Los Angeles won.
- Atlanta at Indianapolis on November 9 at Olympiastadion in Berlin, Germany; Indianapolis won.
- Washington at Miami on November 16 at Santiago Bernabéu Stadium in Madrid. It was the first NFL regular season game held in Spain; Miami won.

- Thanksgiving: Three games were held on Thanksgiving Day, November 27.

- Green Bay at Detroit in the first game of the traditional afternoon doubleheader. The kickoff time for this game was moved from 12:30 p.m. ET to 1:00 p.m. Green Bay won.
- Kansas City at Dallas in the second game of the traditional doubleheader; Dallas won.
- Cincinnati at Baltimore in primtime. Cincinnati won.

- Christmas: Christmas Day, December 25, landed on a Thursday for the first time since the league expanded to a 17 game schedule in 2021. Therefore, the league played Thursday Christmas games for the first time, including two afternoon contests (Dallas at Washington and Detroit at Minnesota) and the regular Thursday Night Football game (Denver at Kansas City). Dallas, Minnesota, and Denver won the games. Prior to 2021, a Thursday Christmas Day normally fell on the final week of the regular season when the league preferred not to schedule any Thursday games that would have given teams a competitive advantage with more rest between it and the opening round of the playoffs.

=== Flexible scheduling rules ===
This was the third season of the league's flexible scheduling system that included Thursday Night Football, Sunday Night Football, Monday Night Football, and increased the amount of cross-flexing (switching) of Sunday afternoon games between CBS and Fox.

In March 2025, NFL owners voted to change the deadline to flex Thursday Night Football games from 28 to 21 days before kickoff. The other rules regarding TNF remain the same: only two games can be flexed between weeks 14 and 16, teams are not required to flex into TNF more than once, teams are not allowed to play more than two Thursday games on short rest during the season, and teams cannot play multiple away TNF games during the season without their approval.

The other flexible scheduling rules remained the same as in 2024. Any Monday Night Football game was allowed to be flexed between weeks 12 and 17; the league was required to announce its rescheduling no later than 12 days before the contests. For Sunday Night Football, no more than two games could be flexed between weeks 5 and 10, while any game between weeks 11 to 17 could be flexed; the league was required to give weeks 5 to 13 SNF games a 12-day notice, and weeks 14 to 17 a 6-day notice. All Week 18 games were initially listed as "TBD", with the league announcing its schedule after Week 17 games are completed.

Additionally, CBS and Fox still had the ability to protect games from being moved (except for Week 18 contests), either from a change to another network or a change of the Sunday afternoon time slot. When the initial season schedule was created, the two networks selected a limited number of games involving a specific number of teams from their respective conference. Otherwise, every game can be initially scheduled on any network regardless of conference. After the season starts, the two networks are allowed to protect one game each week from getting flexed.

=== Scheduling changes ===
Week 6:

- The San Francisco–Tampa Bay game was moved from 1:00 p.m. ET to 4:25 p.m. ET, trading time slots with the New England–New Orleans game; both games remained on CBS.

Week 14:

- The Chicago–Green Bay game was moved from 1:00 p.m. ET to 4:25 p.m. ET, trading time slots with the Cincinnati–Buffalo game; both games remained on Fox.

Week 16:

- Two games were set aside to be played on Saturday, December 20: Philadelphia–Washington and Green Bay–Chicago, with both games played on Fox. On December 2, the times for these games were set for 5:00 p.m. ET and 8:20 p.m. ET, respectively.
- The New England–Baltimore game, originally scheduled for 1:00 p.m. ET on CBS, was flexed into NBC Sunday Night Football at 8:20 p.m. ET, replacing the originally scheduled Cincinnati–Miami game, which was moved to 1:00 p.m. ET on CBS.

Week 17:

- On December 10, the NFL announced that two games have been moved into a doubleheader on Saturday, December 27: Houston–Los Angeles Chargers at 4:30 p.m. ET on NFL Network and Baltimore–Green Bay at 8:00 p.m. ET on Peacock. The other three games that the league had the option of scheduling on Saturday, Arizona–Cincinnati, Seattle–Carolina, and New York Giants–Las Vegas, were scheduled for Sunday, December 28.
- The New England–New York Jets game was cross-flexed from CBS to Fox, remaining at 1:00 p.m. ET.

Week 18:

- All Week 18 games were initially listed with a kickoff time of "TBD"; the schedule was released on December 28 following the conclusion of the Sunday games for Week 17.
  - Two games were selected for the Saturday doubleheader on ESPN and ABC: Carolina–Tampa Bay at 4:30 p.m. ET and Seattle–San Francisco (which decided the NFC West champion and the NFC's top-seed) at 8:15 p.m. ET.
  - The Baltimore–Pittsburgh game, which decided the AFC North champion, was selected as the final NBC Sunday Night Football game at 8:20 p.m. ET.
  - All remaining games were scheduled on Sunday afternoon at either 1:00 or 4:25 p.m. ET on either CBS or Fox.

== Regular season standings ==
=== Division ===
AFC East
	W	L	T	PCT	DIV	CONF	PF	PA	STK
^{(2)} New England Patriots	14	3	0	.824	5–1	9–3	490	320	W3
^{(6)} Buffalo Bills	12	5	0	.706	4–2	9–3	481	365	W1
Miami Dolphins	7	10	0	.412	3–3	3–9	347	424	L1
New York Jets	3	14	0	.176	0–6	2–10	300	503	L5

AFC North
	W	L	T	PCT	DIV	CONF	PF	PA	STK
^{(4)} Pittsburgh Steelers	10	7	0	.588	4–2	8–4	397	387	W1
Baltimore Ravens	8	9	0	.471	3–3	5–7	424	398	L1
Cincinnati Bengals	6	11	0	.353	3–3	5–7	414	492	L1
Cleveland Browns	5	12	0	.294	2–4	4–8	279	379	W2

AFC South
	W	L	T	PCT	DIV	CONF	PF	PA	STK
^{(3)} Jacksonville Jaguars	13	4	0	.765	5–1	10–2	474	336	W8
^{(5)} Houston Texans	12	5	0	.706	5–1	10–2	404	295	W9
Indianapolis Colts	8	9	0	.471	2–4	6–6	466	412	L7
Tennessee Titans	3	14	0	.176	0–6	2–10	284	478	L2

AFC West
	W	L	T	PCT	DIV	CONF	PF	PA	STK
^{(1)} Denver Broncos	14	3	0	.824	5–1	9–3	401	311	W2
^{(7)} Los Angeles Chargers	11	6	0	.647	5–1	8–4	368	340	L2
Kansas City Chiefs	6	11	0	.353	1–5	3–9	362	328	L6
Las Vegas Raiders	3	14	0	.176	1–5	3–9	241	432	W1

NFC East
	W	L	T	PCT	DIV	CONF	PF	PA	STK
^{(3)} Philadelphia Eagles	11	6	0	.647	3–3	8–4	379	325	L1
Dallas Cowboys	7	9	1	.441	4–2	4–7–1	471	511	L1
Washington Commanders	5	12	0	.294	3–3	3–9	356	451	W1
New York Giants	4	13	0	.235	2–4	2–10	381	439	W2

NFC North
	W	L	T	PCT	DIV	CONF	PF	PA	STK
^{(2)} Chicago Bears	11	6	0	.647	2–4	7–5	441	415	L2
^{(7)} Green Bay Packers	9	7	1	.559	4–2	7–4–1	391	360	L4
Minnesota Vikings	9	8	0	.529	4–2	7–5	344	333	W5
Detroit Lions	9	8	0	.529	2–4	6–6	481	413	W1

NFC South
	W	L	T	PCT	DIV	CONF	PF	PA	STK
^{(4)} Carolina Panthers	8	9	0	.471	3–3	6–6	311	380	L2
Tampa Bay Buccaneers	8	9	0	.471	3–3	6–6	380	411	W1
Atlanta Falcons	8	9	0	.471	3–3	7–5	353	401	W4
New Orleans Saints	6	11	0	.353	3–3	4–8	306	383	L1

NFC West
	W	L	T	PCT	DIV	CONF	PF	PA	STK
^{(1)} Seattle Seahawks	14	3	0	.824	4–2	9–3	483	292	W7
^{(5)} Los Angeles Rams	12	5	0	.706	4–2	7–5	518	346	W1
^{(6)} San Francisco 49ers	12	5	0	.706	4–2	9–3	437	371	L1
Arizona Cardinals	3	14	0	.176	0–6	3–9	355	488	L9

=== Conference ===
AFC
Seed	Team	Division	W	L	T	PCT	DIV	CONF	SOS	SOV	STK
Division leaders
1 (Note: Denver finished ahead of New England based on common games (Denver 6–0 to New England 5–1 against: Cincinnati, Las Vegas, NY Giants, NY Jets and Tennessee).)	Denver Broncos	West	14	3	0	.824	5–1	9–3	.422	.378	W2
2	New England Patriots	East	14	3	0	.824	5–1	9–3	.391	.370	W3
3	Jacksonville Jaguars	South	13	4	0	.765	5–1	10–2	.478	.425	W8
4	Pittsburgh Steelers	North	10	7	0	.588	4–2	8–4	.503	.453	W1
Wild cards
5 (Note: Houston finished ahead of Buffalo based on head-to-head victory.)	Houston Texans	South	12	5	0	.706	5–1	10–2	.522	.441	W9
6	Buffalo Bills	East	12	5	0	.706	4–2	9–3	.471	.412	W1
7	Los Angeles Chargers	West	11	6	0	.647	5–1	8–4	.469	.425	L2
Did not qualify for the postseason
8 (Note: Indianapolis finished ahead of Baltimore based on conference record (Indianapolis 6–6 to Baltimore 5–7).)	Indianapolis Colts	South	8	9	0	.471	2–4	6–6	.540	.382	L7
9	Baltimore Ravens	North	8	9	0	.471	3–3	5–7	.507	.408	L1
10	Miami Dolphins	East	7	10	0	.412	3–3	3–9	.488	.378	L1
11 (Note: Cincinnati finished ahead of Kansas City based on conference record (Cincinnati 5–7 to Kansas City 3–9).)	Cincinnati Bengals	North	6	11	0	.353	3–3	5–7	.521	.451	L1
12	Kansas City Chiefs	West	6	11	0	.353	1–5	3–9	.514	.363	L6
13	Cleveland Browns	North	5	12	0	.294	2–4	4–8	.486	.418	W2
14 (Note: Las Vegas finished ahead of NY Jets and Tennessee based on conference record (Las Vegas 3–9 to NY Jets 2–10 and Tennessee 2–10).)	Las Vegas Raiders	West	3	14	0	.176	1–5	3–9	.538	.451	W1
15 (Note: NY Jets finished ahead of Tennessee based on strength of victory (NY Jets .373 to Tennessee .275).)	New York Jets	East	3	14	0	.176	0–6	2–10	.552	.373	L5
16	Tennessee Titans	South	3	14	0	.176	0–6	2–10	.574	.275	L2
Tiebreakers (Note: When breaking ties for three or more teams under the NFL's rules, they are first broken within divisions, then comparing only the highest ranked remaining team from each division.)

Tiebreaker rules (Note: When breaking ties for three or more teams under the NFL's rules, they are first broken within divisions, then comparing only the highest ranked remaining team from each division.)

NFC
Seed	Team	Division	W	L	T	PCT	DIV	CONF	SOS	SOV	STK
Division leaders
1	Seattle Seahawks	West	14	3	0	.824	4–2	9–3	.498	.471	W7
2 (Note: Chicago finished ahead of Philadelphia based on head-to-head victory.)	Chicago Bears	North	11	6	0	.647	2–4	7–5	.458	.406	L2
3	Philadelphia Eagles	East	11	6	0	.647	3–3	8–4	.476	.455	L1
4 (Note: Carolina finished ahead of Tampa Bay and Atlanta based on head-to-head record (Carolina 3–1 to Tampa Bay 2–2 and Atlanta 1–3).)	Carolina Panthers	South	8	9	0	.471	3–3	6–6	.522	.463	L2
Wild cards
5 (Note: LA Rams finished ahead of San Francisco based on common games (LA Rams 9–3 to San Francisco 8–4 against: Arizona, Atlanta, Carolina, Houston, Indianapolis, Jacksonville, New Orleans, Seattle, Tampa Bay and Tennessee).)	Los Angeles Rams	West	12	5	0	.706	4–2	7–5	.526	.485	W1
6	San Francisco 49ers	West	12	5	0	.706	4–2	9–3	.498	.417	L1
7	Green Bay Packers	North	9	7	1	.559	4–2	7–4–1	.483	.431	L4
Did not qualify for the postseason
8 (Note: Minnesota finished ahead of Detroit based on head-to-head sweep.)	Minnesota Vikings	North	9	8	0	.529	4–2	7–5	.514	.431	W5
9	Detroit Lions	North	9	8	0	.529	2–4	6–6	.490	.428	W1
10 (Note: Tampa Bay finished ahead of Atlanta based on common games (Tampa Bay 6–6 to Atlanta 5–7 against: Arizona, Buffalo, Carolina, LA Rams, Miami, New England, New Orleans, NY Jets, San Francisco and Seattle).)	Tampa Bay Buccaneers	South	8	9	0	.471	3–3	6–6	.529	.485	W1
11	Atlanta Falcons	South	8	9	0	.471	3–3	7–5	.495	.449	W4
12	Dallas Cowboys	East	7	9	1	.441	4–2	4–7–1	.438	.311	L1
13	New Orleans Saints	South	6	11	0	.353	3–3	4–8	.495	.333	L1
14	Washington Commanders	East	5	12	0	.294	3–3	3–9	.507	.388	W1
15	New York Giants	East	4	13	0	.235	2–4	2–10	.524	.478	W2
16	Arizona Cardinals	West	3	14	0	.176	0–6	3–9	.571	.422	L9
Tiebreakers (Note: When breaking ties for three or more teams under the NFL's rules, they are first broken within divisions, then comparing only the highest ranked remaining team from each division.)

Tiebreaker rules (Note: When breaking ties for three or more teams under the NFL's rules, they are first broken within divisions, then comparing only the highest ranked remaining team from each division.)

== Postseason ==
The 2025 playoffs began with the wild card round, which ran from January 10–12, 2026, with three games that were played in each conference. The divisional round, which ran from January 17–18, had the top seed in the conference playing the lowest remaining seed; the other two remaining teams played against each other. The winners of those games advanced to the conference championship games, which were played on January 25. Super Bowl LX was played on February 8 at Levi's Stadium in Santa Clara, California with the Seattle Seahawks defeating the New England Patriots for the Vince Lombardi Trophy.

=== 2025–26 NFL playoffs ===
Jan 10 – Bank of America Stadium	Jan 18 – Soldier Field
5	LA Rams	34
4	Carolina	31
5	LA Rams	20*
Jan 25 – Lumen Field
Jan 10 – Soldier Field	2	Chicago	17
NFC
7	Green Bay	27	5	LA Rams	27
Jan 17 – Lumen Field
2	Chicago	31	1	Seattle	31
NFC Championship
Jan 11 – Lincoln Financial Field	6	San Francisco	6
1	Seattle	41
6	San Francisco	23
Divisional round	Feb 8 – Levi's Stadium
3	Philadelphia	19
Wild-card round
N1	Seattle	29
Jan 12 – Acrisure Stadium	Jan 18 – Gillette Stadium	A2	New England	13
Super Bowl LX
5	Houston	30
4	Pittsburgh	6
5	Houston	16
Jan 25 – Empower Field at Mile High
Jan 11 – Gillette Stadium	2	New England	28
AFC
7	LA Chargers	3	2	New England	10
Jan 17 – Empower Field at Mile High
2	New England	16	1	Denver	7
AFC Championship
Jan 11 – EverBank Stadium	6	Buffalo	30
1	Denver	33*
6	Buffalo	27
3	Jacksonville	24

* Indicates overtime victory

== Records, milestones and notable statistics ==
Offseason

On April 1, the NFL announced All-America Football Conference records and statistics will be recognized in its official records. This primarily affects the two teams surviving from the AAFC's 1950 merger with the NFL: the Cleveland Browns and San Francisco 49ers.

- Marion Motley now holds the record for highest yards per carry for a running back, with 5.7. The previous record of 5.4 was held by Jamaal Charles.
- Paul Brown now holds the record for most league championships as head coach, with seven. The previous record of six titles was shared by Bill Belichick, George Halas, and Curly Lambeau.
- Brown also became the eighth head coach to have at least 200 wins.
- Otto Graham now shares the record for most league championships as starting quarterback, with seven, tying the record held by Tom Brady.
- The 1948 San Francisco 49ers now hold the record for most rushing yards in a season, with 3,663. The previous record of 3,296 was held by the 2019 Baltimore Ravens.
- The 1948 49ers also now hold the record for most yards per carry in a season, with 6.1. The previous record of 5.8 was held by the 2024 Baltimore Ravens.
- The 1948 Cleveland Browns season is now recognized as a perfect season joining the 1972 Miami Dolphins season as the only such seasons in league history.
- The 1947–1949 Browns also set the record for the longest unbeaten streak, at 27 games. The previous record of 25 was held by the 1922–1923 Canton Bulldogs.

Week 1

- Aaron Rodgers tied the record for most games with at least four passing touchdowns and no interceptions, with 28. He shares the record with Tom Brady.
- Pete Carroll became the first head coach to win in his coaching debut for four different teams.
- Matthew Stafford became the tenth player with at least 60,000 career passing yards.

Week 2

- Brandon Aubrey became the first player to convert a game-tying field goal with no time remaining in regulation and a game-winning field goal with no time remaining in overtime.
- The Indianapolis Colts became the first team to score on each of its first ten possessions in a season. Indianapolis also became the first team in the Super Bowl era to have no punts in its first two games of a season.

Week 3

- Aaron Rodgers passed Brett Favre for fourth-most career touchdown passes.
- Isaiah Rodgers became the first player to have two forced fumbles, a fumble returned for a touchdown, and an interception returned for a touchdown in the same game.
- Tory Horton became the first player in the Super Bowl era to have multiple receiving touchdowns and a punt return touchdown in his first three career games.
- Jahmyr Gibbs and David Montgomery set the record for most games in which a pair of teammates each scored a rushing touchdown, with 11. They previous record of 10 games was held by two other duos: Paul Hornung and Jim Taylor, and Hugh McElhenny and Joe Perry.
- The Tampa Bay Buccaneers became the first team to win each of its first three games of a season with game-winning scores in the final minute.

Week 4

- Chase McLaughlin set the record for the longest field goal kicked in an outdoor stadium, at 65 yards. The previous record of 64 yards was held by Matt Prater.
- Puka Nacua tied the record for most receptions in the first four games of a season, with 42. He shares the record with Cooper Kupp and Michael Thomas.
- Patrick Mahomes became the youngest player to reach 250 passing touchdowns, at age 30 years, 11 days. The previous record of 30 years, 49 days was held by Dan Marino. Mahomes also became the fastest player to reach this milestone, doing so in 116 games. The previous record of 121 games was held by Aaron Rodgers.

Week 5

- Puka Nacua set the record for most receptions in the first five games of a season, with 52. The previous record of 49 receptions was held by Cooper Kupp.
- Jayden Daniels became the fastest player to reach 4,000 passing yards and 1,000 rushing yards, doing so in 20 games. The previous record of 21 games was shared by Justin Fields, Robert Griffin III, and Lamar Jackson.
- Emeka Egbuka became the first player with at least 25 receptions, 400 receiving yards, and five receiving touchdowns in his first five career games.
- The Tampa Bay Buccaneers became the first team to win four of its first five games with game-winning scores in the final minute, and the first team with four wins by three or fewer points in its first five games.
- The San Francisco 49ers set the record for most consecutive games without recording an interception, with their 12th such game. The previous record of 11 was held by the 2024 New York Giants.
- The Arizona Cardinals became the first team since the NFL merger in 1970 to lose three straight games on a field goal in the game's final play.

Week 7

- Aaron Rodgers passed Ben Roethlisberger for fifth-most career passing yards.
- Bo Nix became the first player to have two passing touchdowns and two rushing touchdowns in a single quarter.
- The Denver Broncos set the record for most points scored in the fourth quarter after being held scoreless in the first three quarters, with 33. The previous record of 31 was held by the 1981 Atlanta Falcons.
- The Arizona Cardinals became the first team to lose three straight games after leading by at least seven points entering the fourth quarter.

Week 8

- Derrick Henry passed Walter Payton for fifth-most career rushing touchdowns.
- Josh Allen set the record for most games with a passing touchdown and a rushing touchdown, with 46. The previous record of 45 was held by Cam Newton.
- James Cook joined his brother, Dalvin Cook, to become the first set of brothers to each have a game with at least 200 rushing yards.
- Myles Garrett set the record for most sacks before a player's 30th birthday, currently with 112.5. The previous record of 108.0 was held by Reggie White.
- The Indianapolis Colts became the first team in the Super Bowl era to allow fewer than ten sacks and have fewer than five turnovers in its first eight games of a season.

Week 9

- Marcedes Lewis became the oldest person to play tight end, at 41 years and 167 days old.
- Cam Little set the record for longest field goal with a 68-yard kick. The previous record of 66 yards was held by Justin Tucker.

Week 10

- Jonathan Taylor tied the record for most games with at least 200 rushing yards and three rushing touchdowns, with two. He shares the record with Jim Brown, Derrick Henry, and Adrian Peterson.
- Lamar Jackson set the record for fewest interceptions in a quarterback's first 100 starts, with 50. The previous record of 54 was held by Aaron Rodgers.
- Matthew Stafford became the first player to have 20 passing touchdowns and no interceptions in a six-game span. He also became the ninth player to throw for at least 400 career touchdown passes.
- DeMarcus Lawrence became the fourth player to have multiple fumbles returned for touchdowns in the same game, joining Jeremy Chinn, Fred Evans, and Al Nesser. Lawrence became the first to have multiple fumbles returned for touchdowns of at least 20 yards.
- Aaron Rodgers passed Matt Ryan for fifth-most career completions.

Week 11

- Josh Allen set the record for most games with at least three passing touchdowns and a rushing touchdown, with ten, having previously shared the record of nine with Tom Brady and Drew Brees. Allen also set the record for most games with at least three passing touchdowns and two rushing touchdowns, with three, having previously shared the record of two with Kordell Stewart. Allen also extended his own record with his second game of three passing touchdowns and three rushing touchdowns.
- Jacoby Brissett set the record for most completed passes in a game, with 47. The previous record of 45 was shared by Drew Bledsoe and Jared Goff.
- The New York Jets set the Super Bowl era record for fewest takeaways in a team's first ten games of a season, with one. The previous record of five was shared by four teams.

Week 12

- Jahmyr Gibbs became the second player to have at least 200 rushing yards and 10 receptions in a game, joining LaDainian Tomlinson.
- Myles Garrett set the record for most sacks in a five-game stretch, with 14. The previous record of 12.5 was held by Michael Strahan.
- Marcus Jones became the second player in the Super Bowl era to have multiple interception return touchdowns, multiple punt return touchdowns, and a receiving touchdown in his career, joining Deion Sanders.

Week 13

- Aaron Rodgers became the fifth player to throw for over 65,000 career passing yards.
- Josh Allen set the record for most rushing touchdowns by a quarterback, with 76. The previous record of 75 was held by Cam Newton.
- Christian McCaffrey tied the record for most seasons with at least 800 rushing yards and 800 receiving yards, with three. He shares the record with Marshall Faulk.
- Trey McBride set the record for most receptions by a tight end in his first four seasons, with 309. The previous record of 301 was held by Jimmy Graham.
- Zach Ertz passed Shannon Sharpe for fifth most career receptions by a tight end.

Week 14

- Brandon Aubrey became the first player to kick three field goals of at least 55 yards in the same game. He also became the first player to kick three field goals of at least 60 yards in the same season.
- Shedeur Sanders became the second rookie to have at least 350 passing yards, three passing touchdowns, and a rushing touchdown in one game, joining Joe Burrow.
- Puka Nacua set the record for most receptions in the first 40 games of a player's career, with 277. The previous record of 274 was held by Michael Thomas.
- Jalen Hurts became the first player to commit two turnovers on the same play. Hurts threw an interception, recovered a fumble, and later lost a fumble.

Week 15

- Trevor Lawrence became the first player to have at least five passing touchdowns, a rushing touchdown, and at least 50 rushing yards in a game.
- Bo Nix became the second quarterback to have 20 wins, 7,000 passing yards, and 50 passing touchdowns in his first two seasons, joining Dan Marino.
- TreVeyon Henderson tied the record for most rushing touchdowns of at least 50 yards by a rookie, with four. He shares the record with Saquon Barkley and Lenny Moore. Henderson also tied the record for most career games with multiple rushing touchdowns of at least 50 yards, with two. He shares this record with Barkley and Chris Johnson.

Week 16

- Trevor Lawrence became the third player to have at least ten touchdowns and no turnovers during a two-game span, joining Drew Brees and Patrick Mahomes.
- Taysom Hill became the first player in the Super Bowl era to have 1,000 passing, rushing, and receiving yards.
- The Los Angeles Rams became the first team to lose a game despite having at least 500 total yards of offense, at least three takeaways, and no turnovers. Such teams were previously 93–0.
- The Pittsburgh Steelers set the record for most consecutive seasons with a record of .500 or better, with 22. They shared the previous record of 21 with the 1965–1985 Dallas Cowboys.

Week 17

- Trey McBride set the record for most receptions by a tight end in a single season with 119. The previous record of 116 was held by Zach Ertz.
- Drake Maye became the first player to have at least 250 passing yards, two passing touchdowns, and complete at least 90% of his pass attempts in a game.
- The Green Bay Packers became the first NFL team to lose three games in a season without a punt. The previous record of two games was held by the 2021 Los Angeles Chargers and the 2024 Cincinnati Bengals.

Week 18

- Cam Little set the record for the longest field goal kicked in an outdoor stadium, with a 67 yard kick. The previous record of 65 yards was held by Chase McLaughlin.
- Myles Garrett set the record for sacks in a single season, with 23.0. The previous record of 22.5 was shared by Michael Strahan and T. J. Watt.
- Travis Kelce tied the record for most consecutive seasons with at least 75 receptions, with ten. He shares the record with Tim Brown.
- Jason Myers set the record for most points by a kicker in a season, with 171. The previous record of 166 was held by David Akers.
- Kaʻimi Fairbairn tied the record for most field goals made in a season with 44. He shares the record with Akers.
- Bobby Wagner became the third player to record 2,000 career tackles, joining London Fletcher and Ray Lewis.
- The Indianapolis Colts became the first team in NFL history to start 8–2 and finish with a losing record.
- The New York Jets set the record for fewest defensive interceptions in a season, with zero. New York also set the record for fewest overall takeaways in a season, with four. The previous records of two interceptions and seven takeaways were held by the 2018 San Francisco 49ers.
- The NFC West became the first division to have three teams win at least 12 games.

Wild Card Round

- Josh Allen became the first player to complete at least 80% of his passes (minimum five attempts) and have at least two rushing touchdowns in a playoff game.
- Allen also set the record for most wins by a quarterback in the playoffs without a Super Bowl appearance, with eight.
- C. J. Stroud became the fourth starting quarterback to win a playoff game in each of his first three seasons, joining Joe Flacco, Otto Graham, and Russell Wilson.
- Aaron Rodgers passed Ben Roethlisberger for third most all-time in playoff passing yards.
- The San Francisco 49ers became the first franchise to win 40 playoff games.
- The Pittsburgh Steelers became the first franchise to lose five consecutive playoff games by 10 or more points.
- In the first four wild card games alone, the league set the record for most fourth quarter lead changes in an entire postseason, with 12. The previous record of 10 lead changes was set in 2007.

Divisional Round

- C. J. Stroud became the first player to throw four interceptions in one half in divisional round history, and second in postseason history to do so.
- Josh Allen set the record for most starts by a quarterback in the postseason without a Super Bowl appearance, with 15.

Conference Championship Round

- Jarrett Stidham became the second quarterback to make his first start of a season in the conference championship game, joining Roger Staubach.
- The New England Patriots became the second team to win 40 playoff games, joining the San Francisco 49ers.

Super Bowl LX

- Jason Myers set the record for most field goals kicked in a Super Bowl, with five. The previous record of four was shared by four players.
- Drake Maye set the record for most sacks taken by a quarterback in a single postseason, with 21. The previous record of 19 was held by Joe Burrow.
- The New England Patriots extended their own record with their 12th Super Bowl appearance. New England also set the record for most losses in the Super Bowl, with six. They shared the previous record of five with the Denver Broncos.
- The Seattle Seahawks became the first Super Bowl champion to commit no turnovers in their postseason run.

== Regular-season statistical leaders ==
Individual
Scoring leader	Jason Myers	Seattle	171
Most field goals made	Kaʻimi Fairbairn	Houston	44
Touchdowns	Jonathan Taylor	Indianapolis	20
Rushing yards	James Cook	Buffalo	1,621
Passing yards	Matthew Stafford	LA Rams	4,707
Passing touchdowns	Matthew Stafford	LA Rams	46
Interceptions thrown	Geno Smith	Las Vegas	17
Passer rating	Drake Maye	New England	113.5
Pass receptions	Puka Nacua	LA Rams	129
Pass receiving yards	Jaxon Smith-Njigba	Seattle	1,793
Combined tackles	Jordyn Brooks	Miami	183
Interceptions	Kevin Byard	Chicago	7
Punting	Corey Bojorquez	Cleveland	4,165; avg 45.8
Sacks	Myles Garrett	Cleveland	23

== Awards ==
The 15th NFL Honors, honoring the best players from the season, was held on February 5, 2026, at the Palace of Fine Arts in San Francisco, California.

Award	Winner	Position	Team
Most Valuable Player	Matthew Stafford	QB	Los Angeles Rams
Offensive Player of the Year	Jaxon Smith-Njigba	WR	Seattle Seahawks
Defensive Player of the Year	Myles Garrett	DE	Cleveland Browns
Offensive Rookie of the Year	Tetairoa McMillan	WR	Carolina Panthers
Defensive Rookie of the Year	Carson Schwesinger	LB	Cleveland Browns
Protector of the Year	Joe Thuney	OG	Chicago Bears
Comeback Player of the Year	Christian McCaffrey	RB	San Francisco 49ers
Coach of the Year	Mike Vrabel	HC	New England Patriots
Assistant Coach of the Year	Josh McDaniels	OC	New England Patriots
Executive of the Year	John Schneider	GM	Seattle Seahawks
Super Bowl Most Valuable Player	Kenneth Walker III	RB	Seattle Seahawks
Walter Payton Man of the Year	Bobby Wagner	LB	Washington Commanders

=== All-Pro team ===
The following players were named first-team All-Pro by the Associated Press (AP):

Offense
QB	Matthew Stafford (LAR)
RB	Bijan Robinson (ATL)
FB	Kyle Juszczyk (SF)
WR	Puka Nacua (LAR); Jaxon Smith-Njigba (SEA); Ja'Marr Chase (CIN)
All-purpose	Christian McCaffrey (SF)
TE	Trey McBride (ARI)
LT	Garett Bolles (DEN)
LG	Joe Thuney (CHI)
C	Creed Humphrey (KC)
RG	Quinn Meinerz (DEN)
RT	Penei Sewell (DET)

Defense
Edge	Myles Garrett (CLE); Will Anderson Jr. (HOU); Micah Parsons (GB)
DT	Jeffery Simmons (TEN); Zach Allen (DEN)
LB	Jack Campbell (DET); Jordyn Brooks (MIA)
CB	Derek Stingley Jr. (HOU); Quinyon Mitchell (PHI)
Slot	Cooper DeJean (PHI)
S	Kyle Hamilton (BAL); Kevin Byard (CHI)

Special teams
K	Will Reichard (MIN)
P	Jordan Stout (BAL)
KR	Ray Davis (BUF)
PR	Chimere Dike (TEN)
ST	Devon Key (DEN)
LS	Ross Matiscik (JAX)

=== Players of the Week / Month ===
The following were named the top performers during the season:

Week / month	Offensive		Defensive		Special teams	
Week / month	AFC	NFC	AFC	NFC	AFC	NFC
1	Josh Allen QB (Buffalo)	J. J. McCarthy QB (Minnesota)	Foyesade Oluokun LB (Jacksonville)	Nate Landman LB (LA Rams)	Chris Boswell K (Pittsburgh)	Kameron Johnson WR (Tampa Bay)
2	Jonathan Taylor RB (Indianapolis)	Jared Goff QB (Detroit)	Roquan Smith LB (Baltimore)	Fred Warner LB (San Francisco)	Antonio Gibson RB (New England)	Brandon Aubrey K (Dallas)
3	Jonathan Taylor RB (Indianapolis)	Caleb Williams QB (Chicago)	Derwin James S (LA Chargers)	Isaiah Rodgers CB (Minnesota)	Andre Szmyt K (Cleveland)	Jordan Davis DT (Philadelphia)
4	Patrick Mahomes QB (Kansas City)	Puka Nacua WR (LA Rams)	Devin Lloyd LB (Jacksonville)	Quinyon Mitchell CB (Philadelphia)	Marcus Jones CB (New England)	Josh Blackwell CB (Chicago)
Sept.	James Cook RB (Buffalo)	Bijan Robinson RB (Atlanta)	Devin Lloyd LB (Jacksonville)	Byron Young LB (LA Rams)	Spencer Shrader K (Indianapolis)	Brandon Aubrey K (Dallas)
5	C. J. Stroud QB (Houston)	Rico Dowdle RB (Carolina)	Nik Bonitto LB (Denver)	Kool-Aid McKinstry CB (New Orleans)	Chimere Dike WR (Tennessee)	Eddy Piñeiro K (San Francisco)
6	Patrick Mahomes QB (Kansas City)	Bijan Robinson RB (Atlanta)	Jonathon Cooper LB (Denver)	Jamel Dean CB (Tampa Bay)	Cameron Dicker K (LA Chargers)	Ryan Fitzgerald K (Carolina)
7	Ja'Marr Chase WR (Cincinnati)	Christian McCaffrey RB (San Francisco)	K'Lavon Chaisson LB (New England)	Micah Parsons DE (Green Bay)	Grant Delpit S (Cleveland)	Sam Martin P (Carolina)
8	James Cook RB (Buffalo)	Jordan Love QB (Green Bay)	Jordyn Brooks LB (Miami)	Anthony Nelson LB (Tampa Bay)	Isaiah Williams WR (NY Jets)	Chase McLaughlin K (Tampa Bay)
Oct.	Jonathan Taylor RB (Indianapolis)	Jaxon Smith-Njigba WR (Seattle)	Marcus Jones CB (New England)	Micah Parsons DE (Green Bay)	Wil Lutz K (Denver)	Eddy Piñeiro K (San Francisco)
9	Lamar Jackson QB (Baltimore)	Colston Loveland TE (Chicago)	Alex Highsmith LB (Pittsburgh)	Tre'von Moehrig S (Carolina)	Cam Little K (Jacksonville)	Levi Drake Rodriguez DL (Minnesota)
10	Jonathan Taylor RB (Indianapolis)	Jahmyr Gibbs RB (Detroit)	Danielle Hunter DE (Houston)	DeMarcus Lawrence DE (Seattle)	Kene Nwangwu RB (NY Jets)	Nathan Shepherd DT (New Orleans)
11	Josh Allen QB (Buffalo)	Bryce Young QB (Carolina)	Jordyn Brooks LB (Miami)	Jordan Davis DT (Philadelphia)	Wil Lutz K (Denver)	Ethan Evans P (LA Rams)
12	Kareem Hunt RB (Kansas City)	Jahmyr Gibbs RB (Detroit)	Myles Garrett DE (Cleveland)	Ji'Ayir Brown S (San Francisco)	Andrés Borregales K (New England)	Zane Gonzalez K (Atlanta)
13	Drake Maye QB (New England)	Jordan Love QB (Green Bay)	Christian Benford CB (Buffalo)	Ernest Jones IV LB (Seattle)	Evan McPherson K (Cincinnati)	Riley Dixon P (Tampa Bay)
Nov.	De'Von Achane RB (Miami)	Matthew Stafford QB (LA Rams)	Myles Garrett DE (Cleveland)	Nahshon Wright CB (Chicago)	Austin McNamara P (NY Jets)	Jason Myers K (Seattle)
14	Josh Allen QB (Buffalo)	Puka Nacua WR (LA Rams)	Rasul Douglas CB (Miami)	Al-Quadin Muhammad DE (Detroit)	Marvin Mims Jr. WR (Denver)	Rashid Shaheed WR (Seattle)
15	Trevor Lawrence QB (Jacksonville)	Kyle Pitts TE (Atlanta)	Alohi Gilman S (Baltimore)	D'Marco Jackson LB (Chicago)	Cameron Dicker K (LA Chargers)	Jason Myers K (Seattle)
16	Joe Burrow QB (Cincinnati)	Brock Purdy QB (San Francisco)	Derek Stingley Jr. CB (Houston)	Cooper DeJean CB (Philadelphia)	Logan Cooke P (Jacksonville)	Cairo Santos K (Chicago)
17	Derrick Henry RB (Baltimore)	Bijan Robinson RB (Atlanta)	Bradley Chubb LB (Miami)	Harrison Smith S (Minnesota)	Tommy Townsend P (Houston)	Jalen Carter DT (Philadelphia)
18	Rhamondre Stevenson RB (New England)	Matthew Stafford QB (LA Rams)	Devin Bush Jr. LB (Cleveland)	Bobby Okereke LB (NY Giants)	Kaʻimi Fairbairn K (Houston)	Zane Gonzalez K (Atlanta)
Dec./Jan.	Trevor Lawrence QB (Jacksonville)	Matthew Stafford QB (LA Rams)	Jeffery Simmons DT (Tennessee)	Chase Young DE (New Orleans)	Cam Little K (Jacksonville)	Will Reichard K (Minnesota)

Week	FedEx Air & Ground Players of the Week		Pepsi Zero Sugar Rookie of the Week
1	Josh Allen QB (Buffalo)	Derrick Henry RB (Baltimore)	Jacory Croskey-Merritt RB (Washington)
2	Ja'Marr Chase WR (Cincinnati)	Amon-Ra St. Brown WR (Detroit)	Tyler Warren TE (Indianapolis)
3	Caleb Williams QB (Chicago)	Jonathan Taylor RB (Indianapolis)	Jaylin Lane WR (Washington)
4	Ashton Jeanty RB (Las Vegas)	Puka Nacua WR (LA Rams)	Woody Marks RB (Houston)
5	Baker Mayfield QB (Tampa Bay)	Jacory Croskey-Merritt RB (Washington)	Jacory Croskey-Merritt RB (Washington)
6	Rico Dowdle RB (Carolina)	Cam Skattebo RB (NY Giants)	Tetairoa McMillan WR (Carolina)
7	Ja'Marr Chase WR (Cincinnati)	Jonathan Taylor RB (Indianapolis)	Oronde Gadsden II TE (LA Chargers)
8	Jordan Love QB (Green Bay)	Jonathan Taylor RB (Indianapolis)	RJ Harvey RB (Denver)
9	Sam Darnold QB (Seattle)	Rico Dowdle RB (Carolina)	Jalon Walker LB (Atlanta)
10	Jonathan Taylor RB (Indianapolis)	Jahmyr Gibbs RB (Detroit)	Nick Emmanwori S (Seattle)
11	Tetairoa McMillan WR (Carolina)	Bryce Young QB (Carolina)	Carson Schwesinger LB (Cleveland)
12	Jahmyr Gibbs RB (Detroit)	Emanuel Wilson RB (Green Bay)	Barrett Carter LB (Cincinnati)
13	Jordan Love QB (Green Bay)	D'Andre Swift RB (Chicago)	TreVeyon Henderson RB (New England)
14	Josh Allen QB (Buffalo)	Jahmyr Gibbs RB (Detroit)	Shedeur Sanders QB (Cleveland)
15	Trevor Lawrence QB (Jacksonville)	Bo Nix QB (Denver)	Jacory Croskey-Merritt RB (Washington)
16	Trevor Lawrence QB (Jacksonville)	Joe Burrow QB (Cincinnati)	Ashton Jeanty RB (Las Vegas)
17	Joe Burrow QB (Cincinnati)	Derrick Henry RB (Baltimore)	Jacory Croskey-Merritt RB (Washington)
18	Trevor Lawrence QB (Jacksonville)	Mitchell Trubisky QB (Buffalo)	Colston Loveland TE (Chicago)

Month	Rookies of the Month	
Month	Offensive	Defensive
Sept.	Emeka Egbuka WR (Tampa Bay)	Xavier Watts S (Atlanta)
Oct.	Jaxson Dart QB (NY Giants)	Teddye Buchanan LB (Baltimore)
Nov.	TreVeyon Henderson RB (New England)	Carson Schwesinger LB (Cleveland)
Dec./Jan.	Tyler Shough QB (New Orleans)	James Pearce Jr. LB (Atlanta)

== Head coaching and general manager changes ==
=== Head coaches ===
==== Off-season ====
Team	Departing coach	Interim coach	Incoming coach	Reason for leaving	Notes
Chicago Bears	Matt Eberflus	Thomas Brown	Ben Johnson	Fired	After a 4–8 (.333) start including a 6-game losing streak, Eberflus was fired as head coach on November 29, 2024, after being hired in 2022. During his two and a half season tenure, Chicago was 14–32 (.304) with no playoff appearances. Brown, the team's offensive coordinator, was named as interim head coach. This was his first head coaching position at any level. He finished the season with a 1–4 (.200) record. Johnson, who spent the previous three seasons as the Detroit Lions' offensive coordinator, was hired on January 21, marking his first head coaching position at any level.
Jacksonville Jaguars	Doug Pederson		Liam Coen	Fired	Pederson was fired on January 6, after three seasons with the Jaguars. During his tenure, the team was 22–29 (.431), with one playoff appearance. Coen, who spent the previous season as the Tampa Bay Buccaneers' offensive coordinator, was hired as the head coach on January 24. It is his first head coaching position at any level.
Las Vegas Raiders	Antonio Pierce		Pete Carroll	Fired	Pierce was fired on January 7, after one and a half seasons with the Raiders. During his tenure, the team went 9–17 (.346) with no playoff appearances. Carroll was hired on January 25. He has eighteen seasons of experience as head coach of the New York Jets, New England Patriots, and Seattle Seahawks, with a combined record of 170–120–1 (.586), twelve playoff berths, two Super Bowl appearances, the Super Bowl XLVIII championship, and an overall playoff record of 11–11 (.500). Carroll was also head coach of USC for nine seasons, accumulating a record of 97–19 (.836) and two national championships. At 73 years old, Carroll will become the oldest head coach in NFL history.
New England Patriots	Jerod Mayo		Mike Vrabel	Fired	Mayo was fired on January 5, after one 4–13 (.235) season with the Patriots and no playoff appearances. On January 12, the Patriots hired Vrabel as their new head coach. As the head coach of the Tennessee Titans from 2018 to 2023, he compiled a record of 54–45 (.545), with three playoff appearances and a 2–3 (.400) playoff record.
New Orleans Saints	Dennis Allen	Darren Rizzi	Kellen Moore	Fired	After a 2–7 (.222) start including a 7-game losing streak, Allen was fired on November 4, 2024, after two and a half seasons as the team's head coach. During his tenure, the Saints were 18–25 (.419) with no playoff appearances. Rizzi, the team's special teams coordinator, was elevated as interim head coach. He finished the season with a 3–5 (.375) record. Moore was hired on February 11. He previously served as the Dallas Cowboys offensive coordinator from 2019 to 2022, the Chargers in 2023, and the Eagles in 2024, winning Super Bowl LIX with the Eagles. This is his first head coaching position at any level.
New York Jets	Robert Saleh	Jeff Ulbrich	Aaron Glenn	Fired	Saleh was fired as head coach on October 8, 2024, with a 20–36 (.357) record (2–3 in 2024). along with no playoff appearances after being hired in 2021. Ulbrich, the team's defensive coordinator, was named interim head coach. This was his first head coaching position. He finished the season with a 3–9 (.250) record. Glenn was hired on January 22 after spending the previous four years as the defensive coordinator for the Detroit Lions. This is his first head coaching job at any level.
Dallas Cowboys	Mike McCarthy		Brian Schottenheimer	Contract expired	McCarthy's contract was not renewed by the Cowboys on January 13 after five seasons together. During his tenure, the team went 49–35 (.583), with two NFC East division titles in three overall playoff appearances, and a playoff record of 1–3 (.250). Schottenheimer, who served as Dallas' offensive coordinator for the previous two seasons, was hired as the head coach on January 24. It is his first head coaching position at any level.

==== In-season ====
Team	Departing coach	Reason for leaving	Interim replacement	Notes
Tennessee Titans	Brian Callahan	Fired	Mike McCoy	Callahan was fired as head coach on October 13 with a 4–19 (.174) record (1–5 in 2025) after being hired in 2024. McCoy, the team's senior offensive assistant, took over as interim coach. This is his second NFL head coaching position, having previously been the head coach of the San Diego Chargers from 2013 to 2016, with a record of 27–37 (.422) and one playoff appearance.
New York Giants	Brian Daboll	Fired	Mike Kafka	Daboll was fired as head coach on November 10 with a 20–40–1 (.336) record (2–8 in 2025) after being hired in 2022 and appearing in the playoffs once in 2022. Kafka, the team's assistant head coach & offensive coordinator, took over as interim coach. This is his first head coaching position at any level.

=== General managers ===
==== Off-season ====
Team	Departing GM	Interim replacement	Incoming GM	Reason for leaving	Notes
Jacksonville Jaguars	Trent Baalke		James Gladstone	Fired	Baalke was fired on January 22, after four and a half seasons. On February 21, the Jaguars named Gladstone, the Los Angeles Rams' director of scouting strategy, as their new general manager.
New York Jets	Joe Douglas	Phil Savage	Darren Mougey	Fired	Douglas was fired on November 19, 2024, after six seasons. Savage, the team's senior personnel advisor, was named interim GM. Savage previously served as general manager of the Cleveland Browns from 2005 to 2008. On January 25, the Jets named Mougey, former assistant general manager of the Denver Broncos, as the new general manager. He previously served for the Broncos from 2012 to 2024 in various executive roles.
Las Vegas Raiders	Tom Telesco		John Spytek	Fired	Telesco was fired on January 9, after only one season. Spytek was hired on January 24, previously serving as the vice president of player personnel from 2021 to 2022 and assistant general manager for the past two years, both positions with the Tampa Bay Buccaneers.
Tennessee Titans	Ran Carthon		Mike Borgonzi	Fired	Carthon was fired on January 7, after two seasons. Borgonzi was hired on January 17. He previously served for the Kansas City Chiefs from 2009 to 2024 in various executive roles and in the final three years as the assistant general manager.

==== In-season ====
Team	Departing GM	Reason for leaving	Interim replacement	Notes
Miami Dolphins	Chris Grier	Mutual agreement	Champ Kelly	Grier and the Dolphins mutually agreed to part ways on October 31, after almost ten seasons as Dolphins' GM with a 77–80 (.490) record and three play-off appearances. Kelly, the team's senior personnel executive, was named interim GM. Previously, he was the interim general manager of the Las Vegas Raiders in 2023.

== Stadiums ==
This was the final season in which the Buffalo Bills played their home games at the than-current Highmark Stadium. The new stadium, also called Highmark Stadium, was completed by the start of the 2026 season.

== Uniforms ==
The NFL announced a policy change that allows teams to wear their alternate or throwback designs four times per season, up from the previous limit of three. Teams are now permitted to pair alternate helmets with non-alternate uniforms. Additionally, qualifying teams can wear alternate pants during playoff games.

For the first time, five award-winning players from the previous season will have a golden NFL emblem on their jersey collars throughout the season: Josh Allen (Most Valuable Player), Saquon Barkley (Offensive Player of the Year), Patrick Surtain II (Defensive Player of the Year), Jayden Daniels (Offensive Rookie of the Year) and Jared Verse (Defensive Rookie of the Year).

=== Rivalries series ===
During the 2025 NFL draft, Nike and the NFL announced a "Rivalries" uniform program, which featured new designs for home teams playing against a divisional opponent. AFC East and NFC West teams debut these uniforms this season. The plan was for teams to wear these uniforms at one home divisional game per season. The Arizona Cardinals were the first team to wear the Rivalries uniforms, which they did in their Week 4 match-up with the Seattle Seahawks.

The first set of "Rivalries" uniforms were unveiled on August 28.

- Arizona: all-tan uniforms with speckled sand, red and copper accents, nicknamed "Built to Last".
- Buffalo: all-white uniforms with silver and blue accents, nicknamed the "Cold Front".
- Los Angeles Rams: all-midnight blue uniforms with royal blue, yellow and white accents, nicknamed the "Midnight Mode".
- Miami: all-dark blue uniforms with aqua and orange accents, nicknamed the "Dark Waters".
- New England: storm blue jerseys with white pants and white helmets, nicknamed the "Nor'easter".
- New York Jets: all-Gotham green (a darker green-tinted shade of black) uniforms with silver and tonal grey accents, nicknamed "Gotham City Football".
- San Francisco: all-black uniforms with red and gold accents, nicknamed "For the Faithful".
- Seattle: wolf grey uniforms with iridescent green and navy blue accents, along with iridescent green helmets, nicknamed "12 As One".

=== Uniform changes ===
- Buffalo announced the return of their "Standing Buffalo" throwback uniforms inspired by the team's road uniform from 1962 to 1973. They were worn for two games (one home and away game each) and for the first time since 2021.
- Chicago announced that the alternate orange and white throwback uniforms would not be worn during the season as a tribute to Virginia Halas McCaskey, who died on February 6.
- Cleveland announced the return of their all-brown alternate uniforms, wearing them for the first time since 2022. This time, the uniform was paired with a new alternate helmet listed below dubbed the "Alpha Dawg". This uniform was worn for three games.
- Green Bay introduced a new throwback uniform inspired by what they wore in 1923, replacing the 1950s throwback uniform worn from 2021 to 2024. This uniform includes navy blue jerseys with dark gold numbers and dark gold stripes, tan pants and navy socks, and an alternate brown helmet listed below.
- The Los Angeles Chargers unveiled "Charger Power" and "Super Charger" alternate uniforms for the season. The Charger Power uniform includes a gold jersey for the first time in franchise history along with gold pants, and was worn for one game. The Super Charger uniform is inspired by the Chargers' home uniform from 1988 to 2006 when the Chargers were based in San Diego, consisting of an all-navy set that includes a modernized helmet, jersey, and pants. The Super Charger uniform was worn for three games. The Chargers also added powder blue pants to its uniform rotation, a first for the team.
- New England introduced white pants to be worn with their road jerseys. The team last wore white pants in 2017.
- New Orleans introduced an alternate gold uniform paired with their alternate black helmet. The team last wore gold jerseys in 2002.
- The New York Giants brought back the white vintage uniform first used during the NFL's Color Rush program after a one-season absence, and will now be worn regularly with the throwback navy blue helmets featuring the "GIANTS" wordmark. This replaced the 2024 "Century Red" throwback uniform which commemorated the franchise's 100th anniversary.
- Pittsburgh introduced a new throwback uniform, replacing the team's previous 1970s-era throwback that was identical to the team's current uniforms but featured block numerals instead of the Futura Condensed that the team switched to in 1997. This uniform is inspired by their uniform worn during their inaugural season in 1933. The uniform features a gold jersey with black stripes and large white block letters trimmed in black on the front and large black block numbers on the back, beige pants with gold socks, and a gold helmet listed below. This uniform was worn for one game.
- Tampa Bay introduced a white road version of their creamsicle throwback uniforms. The jerseys feature fluorescent orange numbers outlined in red, matching what the Buccaneers wore during their inaugural season in 1976, as well as fluorescent orange and red stripes on the sleeves/cuffs. The jersey is paired with the helmet and pants that the team wore with the home version of the creamsicle throwback uniforms. This uniform was worn in their home opener and a road game.
- Tennessee switched their home jersey color from navy blue to a light "Titans blue", a design that previously served as their alternate uniform. Their Houston Oilers throwback uniforms were discontinued.
- Washington introduced a new alternate inspired by the team's set worn in the 1980s, dubbed the "Super Bowl Era" uniforms. The set features white jerseys with burgundy numbers outlined in gold, a burgundy collar, and burgundy and gold cuffs and numbers on the sleeves, including the original nameplate font and lacking the wordmark above the numbers that was added in 2002. The pants are burgundy, which include gold and white stripes down the sides, as well as white socks with a burgundy and gold striping pattern. This uniform also includes an alternate helmet listed below. It was worn for three games.

=== Alternate helmets ===
- Buffalo featured an alternate red helmet resembling the design worn by the team from 1984 to 2001. They wore the helmet during their final regular season game at Highmark Stadium.
- Cleveland paired their all-brown "Alpha Dawg" alternate listed above with a brown helmet. This helmet features a matte all-brown shell, with a brown stripe between two orange stripes in the middle and an all-brown facemask. It is the first brown helmet in franchise history.
- Green Bay paired their new 1923 throwback uniform listed above with a brown hand-painted helmet designed to emulate the vintage leather look of the NFL's earliest helmets. The brown helmets feature realistic distressing and hand-decorated leather strap with stitching effects, and with a navy face mask.
- The Los Angeles Chargers paired the Super Charger alternate uniform listed above with a navy-blue helmet with a modernized version of the team's logo from 1991 to 2006.
- New Orleans introduced a new white helmet that was worn with their alternate white uniforms. The helmet has a gold stripe and face mask.
- Pittsburgh paired their new throwback uniform listed above with a gold matte helmet that has a gray facemask and a black stripe down the middle. The team's current logo is on one side of the helmet similarly to the Steelers' primary helmet. The Steelers last wore gold helmets in 2011.
- Washington added an alternate helmet to accompany their new alternate uniform. The helmet is burgundy and displays the Commanders' primary "W" logo on the sides, but features a gold facemask – which became a fixture on the then-Redskins' helmets in 1978 – and the classic striping pattern that first appeared in 1972.

=== Patches ===
- Baltimore wore a patch commemorating its 30th season.
- Buffalo wore a patch in their first and last regular season home games this season commemorating their farewell season at Highmark Stadium.
- Chicago wore a patch honoring former owner Virginia Halas McCaskey, who died on February 6. The patch is shaped like a football that displays McCaskey's "VHM" initials, and it was worn for the entirety of the season.
- Indianapolis wore a patch memorializing former owner Jim Irsay, who died on May 21, 2025.
- Seattle wore a patch commemorating its 50th season.
- Tampa Bay also wore a patch commemorating its 50th season. There were three different versions of the team's 50th anniversary patch. The patch that was on their home jerseys were red with a white number 50, while the patch for the away jerseys were white with a red 50. Both patches had an orange and black outline on the 50, a black banner with the word "seasons" below, and the team's current "skulls and swords" logo in-between the years 1976 and 2025 on the bottom. The patch that was worn with both of the team's throwback jerseys was white with the numbers being creamsicle and having a red outline. The banner in the middle was red instead of black, and the logo on the bottom used the "Bucco Bruce" logo.

== Media ==
=== National ===
This was the third season under 11-year U.S. media rights agreements with CBS Sports, Fox Sports, NBC Sports, ESPN/ABC, and NFL Network; the fourth year of a 12-year deal with Amazon Prime Video; the third year under a seven-year deal with YouTube; and the second year of a three-year deal with Netflix.

==== Linear television ====
- Sunday afternoon games were split between CBS and Fox. Both networks continued to carry the Sunday afternoon AFC and NFC packages, respectively. When the initial schedule was created, CBS and Fox were able to specify a limited number of games involving teams from their respective conference that they want to air, but otherwise the league was free to schedule games regardless of conference. Each network aired ten Sunday doubleheaders, with both networks airing one in Weeks 15 and 18. Fox also acquired the rights to air a Saturday doubleheader in Week 16 this season, which breaks the single season record for the most doubleheaders by a network at 11. On Thanksgiving, Fox had the early Detroit game and CBS aired the late Dallas game.
- NBC continued to air Sunday Night Football, the NFL Kickoff Game, and the primetime Thanksgiving game.
- ESPN continued to produce Monday Night Football and the doubleheader on the last Saturday of the season. This season, ESPN aired two MNF traditional doubleheaders (one of the doubleheaders was formed due to an originally scheduled game to air exclusively on ESPN+ in week 7) and two "split doubleheaders" in which ESPN and ABC aired separate games simultaneously. 11 MNF games and the Saturday doubleheader were ESPN/ABC simulcasts. 12 games also featured the alternative Manningcast on ESPN2. An alternate broadcast of the Week 14 MNF game aired on ESPN2, Disney Channel, and Disney XD as Monsters Funday Football that used the league's player tracking data to render a live animated version of the game portrayed by Monsters, Inc. characters. ESPN then produced alternate broadcasts of the Week 16 and 17 MNF games on ESPN2 as MNF Playbook with Next Gen Stats, which featured real-time data of the games generated from the league's Next Gen Stats system.
- NFL Network aired all International Series games in Europe and the Week 17 Saturday afternoon game.

==== Streaming ====
- Amazon Prime Video and Twitch exclusively streamed Thursday Night Football, and the game on the Friday after Thanksgiving under the title Black Friday Football.
- Peacock simulcast NBC's games. This was also the third season in a six-year deal that the platform exclusively streamed one regular season game, with this year's contest being the Week 17 Saturday night game. Peacock also produced two alternative casts this season: one of NBC's Thanksgiving game that will use the league's player tracking data to render a live version of the game using elements of the Madden 26 video game, and the second was the Week 14 SNF game as Reality Hot Seat featuring reality TV celebrities commenting on the game.
- ESPN's new direct-to-consumer streaming service simulcast all ESPN-produced games, as well as all 12 Manningcasts. Monsters Funday Football was streamed on both the new ESPN streaming service and Disney+. The new ESPN streaming service also simulcast the MNF Playbook alternate broadcasts in Weeks 16 and 17, then had additional exclusive ones for the Saturday night Week 18 game and ESPN's postseason games. This was also to be the fourth year of a 12-year deal that the platform exclusively streams one regular season game under the ESPN+ branding, which was set to the second game of a MNF doubleheader in Week 7 (the first game will be the traditional MNF game on ESPN and ABC). However, that game was moved to ESPN as noted above.
- Paramount+ simulcast in market and national CBS games.
- Fox One simulcast in market and national Fox games. Additionally, after streaming Super Bowl LIX, Fox announced that Tubi would simulcast the network's Thanksgiving Day game in Detroit.
- Netflix exclusively streamed two Christmas Day games.
- For this season only, both YouTube and YouTube TV streamed the International Series game in Brazil to a worldwide audience for free. The NFL Sunday Ticket out-of-market sports package then was available on both YouTube TV and YouTube Primetime Channels as a standalone subscription option.
- The league's streaming service NFL+ continued to live stream in-market and national regular season and postseason games on mobile devices only, radio broadcasts for all games, most out-of-market preseason games and a live stream of NFL Network on its base tier, and replays of games along with a live stream of NFL RedZone on its premium tier.

==== Postseason ====
All four broadcast partners aired at least one Wild Card round game, with CBS and Fox airing an AFC and NFC Wild Card game, respectively. NBC aired the Sunday night game under the fifth year of its seven-year deal. ESPN/ABC will broadcast the Monday night Wild Card game, its last in a five-year deal. Fox will air a second Wild Card game this season as part of the rotation with NBC and CBS. This will also be the second postseason under a multi-year deal that Amazon Prime Video will exclusively stream a Wild Card playoff game.

This was the third season that all four broadcast television partners air one divisional playoff game per season (ESPN/ABC, Fox, CBS, and NBC).

NBC televised Super Bowl LX in the annual rotation of Super Bowl broadcasters. Under this rotation, the league awarded NBC the Super Bowl during the same years it has its Winter Olympics coverage. Super Bowl LX joined Super Bowl LVI as the second time that the game is scheduled on a date within the date range of an ongoing Olympics event (the 2026 Winter Olympics in Milan and Cortina d'Ampezzo, Italy).

==== Radio ====
- Westwood One Radio had rights to air all games televised by the national partners (including streaming).
- ESPN Radio and Sports USA Radio Network had rights to air select Sunday afternoon games on its radio networks.
- This was the fourth season of the league's five-year deal with SiriusXM to simulcast all 32 teams' local regular season and postseason broadcasts, including a wraparound show called SiriusXM NFL Sunday Drive.

==== Personnel changes ====
On March 3, Fox NFL Sunday studio analyst Jimmy Johnson announced his retirement from broadcasting. Johnson was replaced by Rob Gronkowski.

On March 26, CBS announced that J. J. Watt would replace Charles Davis as the network's No. 2 color commentator, moving from The NFL Today. Watt will work with play-by-play commentator Ian Eagle. Davis would move to the #4 team with Andrew Catalon and Jason McCourty, replacing Tiki Barber. After a trial during the 2024 season, Adam Schein became the anchor for in-game updates during CBS telecasts; the role had previously been held by a rotation of The NFL Today analysts.

On July 14, Fox added Allison Williams to its roster of NFL sideline reporters. Williams joined the #5 team with Kevin Kugler and Daryl Johnston, replacing Laura Okmin, who retired from the network.

On August 11, ESPN elevated sideline reporter Laura Rutledge to join the lead broadcast team for Monday Night Football full-time alongside Lisa Salters, who was also given a contract extension with the network. Rutledge had previously been part of ESPN's #2 broadcast team and joined Salters on the sidelines for marquee MNF games and the NFL playoffs. Replacing Rutledge on the #2 team are college football and NBA reporter Katie George and recent hire Peter Schrager.

On November 7, Fox hired Drew Brees as a game analyst. Brees replaced Mark Sanchez on the #3 team with Adam Amin, after Sanchez was arrested on October 4 following a stabbing incident in Indianapolis. Sanchez was subsequently fired by Fox.

=== International ===
- ESPN additionally aired its slate of games in Latin America, sub-Saharan Africa, Oceania and the Netherlands, and will air games through Disney+ in select markets in Asia and Europe.
- In the UK and Ireland, Sky Sports continued broadcasting games from the regular season to the Super Bowl (Including every international games) through their dedicated Sky Sports NFL Channel, but will also broadcast games through their Sky Sports+ channels (originally released in 2024 for the English Football League among other sports). As well as this, free-to-air Channel 5, which the NFL has an interest in network owner Paramount Skydance since 2022, broadcast games through their main channel as well as 5Action. CBS Sports, also owned by Paramount Skydance, is the production company.
- Fox Sports additionally aired its slate of games in Argentina, Mexico and Puerto Rico.
- NFL Network International aired select games worldwide (with NFL Game Pass International is also available to purchase via DAZN).
- This was the fourth year of a multi-year deal with Bell Media to continue to distribute all NFL games in Canada (including RedZone) to TSN, CTV channels in English and on RDS in French.

==== Most watched regular season games ====
All times Eastern.

Rank	Date	Time	Matchup			TV Network(s)	Streaming	Viewers (millions)	TV Rating	Window	Notes
1	Nov 27	4:30 p.m.	Kansas City Chiefs	28–31	Dallas Cowboys	CBS	Paramount+	57.2	46.5	Thanksgiving	Most watched regular-season game in NFL History
2	Nov 27	1:00 p.m.	Green Bay Packers	31–24	Detroit Lions	Fox	Fox One/Tubi	47.7	38.8	Thanksgiving	Lions–Packers rivalry
3	Sep 14	4:25 p.m.	Philadelphia Eagles	20–17	Kansas City Chiefs	Fox	Fox One	33.8	27.5	Late DH	Super Bowl LIX rematch
4	Nov 2	4:25 p.m.	Kansas City Chiefs	21–28	Buffalo Bills	CBS	Paramount+	30.9	25.1	Late DH	2024 AFC Championship Game rematch, Bills–Chiefs rivalry
5	Nov 16	4:25 p.m.	Kansas City Chiefs	19–22	Denver Broncos	CBS	Paramount+	28.9	23.5	Late DH	Broncos–Chiefs rivalry
6	Dec 28	4:25 p.m.	Philadelphia Eagles	13–12	Buffalo Bills	Fox	Fox One	28.8	23.4	Late DH	
7	Dec 21	4:25 p.m.	Pittsburgh Steelers	29–24	Detroit Lions	CBS	Paramount+	28.6	23.3	Late DH	
8	Nov 27	8:20 p.m.	Cincinnati Bengals	32–14	Baltimore Ravens	NBC	Peacock	28.4	23.1	Thanksgiving	Bengals–Ravens rivalry
9	Sep 4	8:20 p.m.	Dallas Cowboys	20–24	Philadelphia Eagles	NBC	Peacock	28.3	23.0	Kickoff Game	Cowboys–Eagles rivalry
10	Dec 7	4:25 p.m.	Chicago Bears	21–28	Green Bay Packers	Fox	Fox One	28.0	22.8	Late DH	Bears–Packers rivalry

- Television networks include the corresponding Spanish network broadcasts through Telemundo, Universo, ESPN Deportes, Fox Deportes, and SAP.
- For Doubleheader regional windows (Early DH and Late DH), the viewership total includes all regionally-televised games on the indicated network and specific timeslot.
- For Single game regional windows, the viewership total includes all regionally-televised games on the indicated network – both the "early" and "late" timeslots.
- (~xx%): Indicates the approximate percentage of viewers nationwide that received the featured game regionally.
