= Elmbrook School District =

School district in Wisconsin, United States

Location
- Brookfield, Wisconsin Milwaukee Area United States

District information
- Type: Public School District
- Motto: Become what's next
- Grades: PreK-12
- Superintendent: Dr. Mark Hansen
- Accreditations: North Central Association of Colleges and Schools
- Schools: 10

Students and staff
- Students: 7,727
- Teachers: 509.25
- Student–teacher ratio: 15.17

Other information
- Website: elmbrookschools.org

The Elmbrook Schools or School District of Elmbrook is a public school district in Brookfield, Wisconsin. It serves Brookfield, Elm Grove, and a small portion of New Berlin. There is also open enrollment that allows people from different cities to attend, while providing their own transportation.

== History ==
The voters of the Elmbrook School District approved by referendum a $62.2 million project to remodel both district high schools. The vote held on April 1, 2008, passed with a 52% majority.

== Board of education ==
The Elmbrook Board of Education consists of seven members, four representing districts, and three elected at large.

== Schools ==
Elementary schools:

- Brookfield Elementary School (Brookfield)
- Burleigh Elementary School (Brookfield)
- Dixon Elementary School (Brookfield)
- Swanson Elementary School (Brookfield)
- Tonawanda Elementary School (Elm Grove)

Middle schools:

- Wisconsin Hills Middle School (Brookfield)
- Pilgrim Park Middle School (Elm Grove)

High schools:

- Brookfield Central High School (Brookfield)
- Brookfield East High School (Brookfield)

Special education:

- Fairview South School (WCSEC) (Brookfield)

Closed schools:

- Hillside Elementary (Brookfield) (closed in 2012)

== Transportation ==
In December 2016, the district faced concerns about student transportation after a First Student bus driver assigned to Swanson Elementary School was arrested on charges related to driving while impaired and possessing a firearm. The incident prompted Superintendent Mark Hansen to express concerns about the district's confidence in the company's ability to transport students safely. In response, the district reviewed its relationship with First Student. In a subsequent report, WISN 12 News reported that the district recommended switching bus companies following the incident. The district switched to GoRiteway Transportation Group

== 2022 cyberattack ==
In August 2022, the School District of Elmbrook experienced a cyberattack in which an unauthorized individual accessed part of the district's computer network. The district detected the intrusion on August 23 and subsequently discovered that files containing personal information about district employees and educational records of some students had been published on the dark web. The ransomware group Vice Society was identified by cybersecurity experts as responsible for the attack.

The district stated that the exposed information did not include students' Social Security numbers and that its Infinite Campus student information system had not been compromised. In a September 2022 communication to families and staff, Superintendent Mark Hansen said that no ransom had been requested and that the district had not engaged with the attackers. The district offered affected employees one year of credit monitoring and contacted a limited number of current and former students and their families whose educational records had been exposed.

== Safety incidents ==
=== 2023 Wisconsin Hills Middle School incident ===
In September 2023, a teacher at Wisconsin Hills Middle School in Brookfield was accused of making an antisemitic gesture and remark in class. The school's principal informed parents that the incident had occurred on September 21. According to the principal's letter, the district investigated and determined that the teacher had not intended to cause harm but had violated school policy. The school said corrective measures were being taken but did not publicly detail them.

=== 2024 Brookfield Elementary School bomb threats ===
In April 2024, Brookfield Elementary School received two bomb threats, on April 9 and April 17, prompting evacuations of students and staff while police searched the premises. On April 9, police determined that the threat was a swatting incident, and the school was cleared for students and staff to return. Following the second threat, police and explosive-ordnance-detection K-9 units searched the school and deemed it safe. Authorities said the two threats had been made in a similar manner but could not confirm whether they came from the same individual. Elmbrook School Board President Scott Wheeler said the board would discuss the incidents and the district's next steps in a closed session.
