= NFL Protector of the Year =

National Football League award

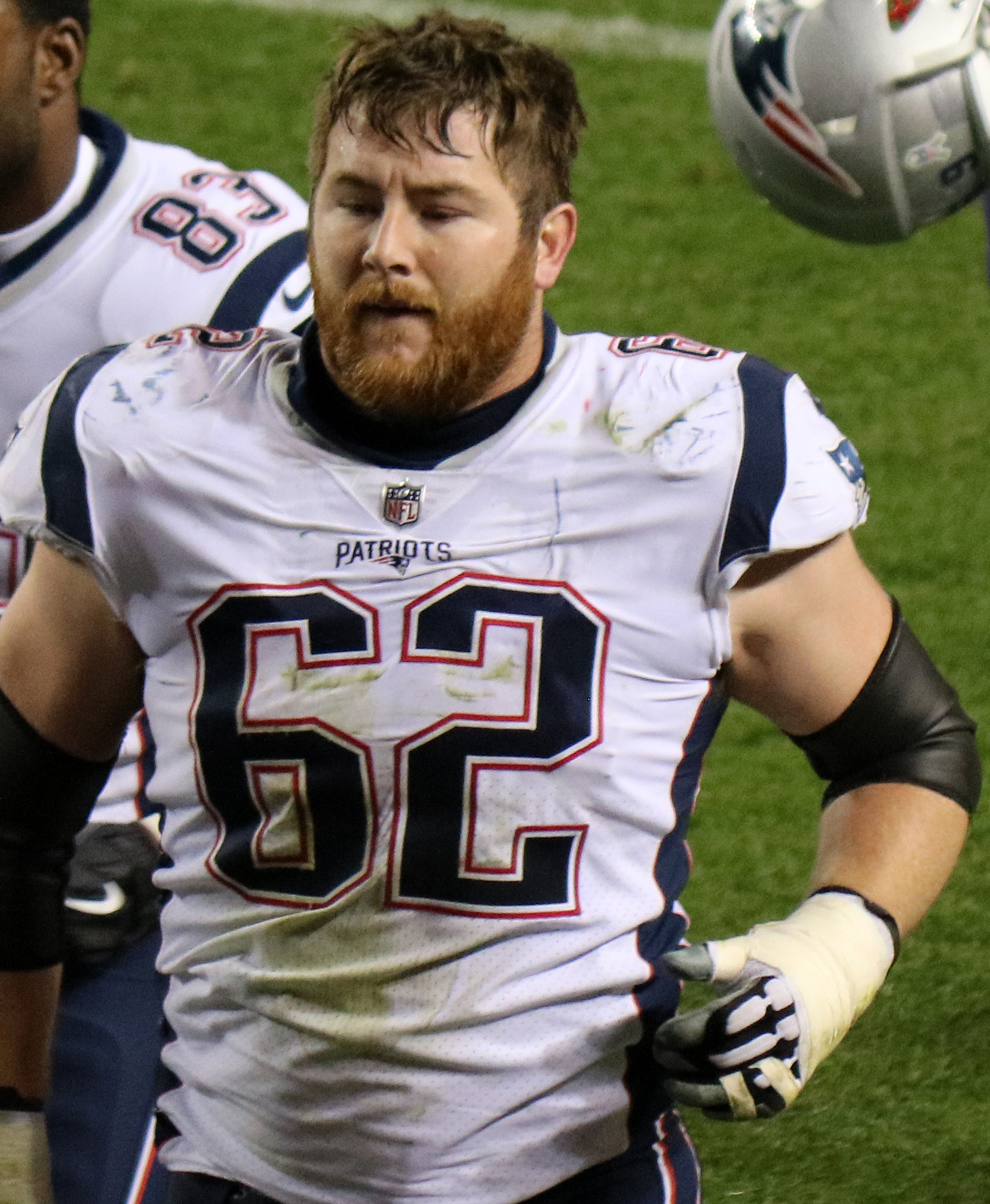
- Chicago Bears guard Joe Thuney, inaugural recipient
- Awarded for: Best offensive lineman in the NFL
- Presented by: National Football League

History
- First award: 2025
- Most recent: Joe Thuney

The NFL Protector of the Year is an award given annually to the best offensive lineman in the National Football League. Introduced in the 2025 NFL season, it is presented annually as part of the NFL Honors.

== History ==
Offensive linemen typically do not garner the same recognition as skill positions such as quarterback and running back, whom they are tasked with blocking for. The NFL also acknowledged that they are "the only players who aren’t eligible for most on-field awards."

Various accolades have existed to celebrate the league's offensive linemen. The National 1,000 Yard Club, a foundation honoring players who ran for over one thousand yards in a season, awarded the Outstanding Blocker of the Year starting with the 1964 season and through 1977. Celebrated as a "long overdue award" upon its creation, individual linemen as well as offensive lines as a whole were recognized.

The NFL Players Association gave out the Offensive Lineman of the Year from 1967 to 1999, while NFL Alumni did so from 1982 to 2010. Forrest Gregg, who received the inaugural NFLPA award, was the name for a similar honor given by the Pro Football Writers of America's Wisconsin chapter between 1970 and 1982. Others included Football Digest's Offensive Lineman of the Year from 1973 to 1984, Seagram's Sports Awards from 1974 to 1986, and Pro Football Focus' Bruce Matthews Award since 2013. The Seagram award was determined by a panel of offensive and defensive line coaches.

From 2009 to 2012, the Madden Most Valuable Protectors award was given to the best offensive line; a weekly honor was also bestowed by namesake John Madden. The Built Ford Tough Offensive Line of the Year, another unit-specific trophy, was awarded at the NFL Honors from 2016 to 2018.

The Protector of the Year was created by Buffalo Bills tackle Dion Dawkins, who proclaimed he "won't stop fighting to give offensive linemen the respect and recognition we deserve." Dawkins had been vocal since the 2024 season about having an award for linemen, and he pitched the idea to league commissioner Roger Goodell at a Super Bowl LIX party. The award was first given at the 15th NFL Honors to Chicago Bears guard Joe Thuney.

== Selection process ==
The award is decided by a panel of retired offensive linemen. The panel nominates five players as finalists before selecting a winner.

Five criteria are taken into account when choosing a winner:

- Skill metrics: Statistical categories such as the lineman's win rate in pass protection and run blocking, quarterback sacks allowed, and penalties committed
- Impact: The player's contribution to his offense's overall success like total yardage
- Leadership: The player's attitude toward his teammates and during games
- Durability: The minimum number of snaps and games played
- Strength of opponent: The lineman's success against the top defensive players

== Winners ==
Season	Player	Position	Team	Statistics				Ref
Season	Player	Position	Team	GP	Snaps	Pct	Pen	Ref
2025	Joe Thuney	G	Bears	17	1149	100%	2	

== See also ==
- List of NFL awards
- Madden Most Valuable Protectors award
- Built Ford Tough Offensive Line of the Year
