= Brookfield East High School =

Public school in Wisconsin, United States

Location
- 3305 North Lilly Road; Brookfield, Wisconsin 53005; United States; 43°4′43″N 88°5′13″W

Information
- Type: Public Secondary
- Established: 1962
- School district: Elmbrook School District
- Principal: Andy Farley
- Teaching staff: 83.46 (FTE)
- Grades: 9–12
- Enrollment: 1,398 (2023-2024)
- Student to teacher ratio: 16.75
- Colors: Navy, scarlet and white
- Athletics conference: Greater Metro Conference
- Mascot: Spartans ("Sparty")
- Rival: Brookfield Central High School
- Newspaper: Spartan Banner
- Yearbook: Echo
- Website: School website

Brookfield East High School is a four-year public secondary school located in Brookfield, Wisconsin. The school is part of the Elmbrook School District, and is accredited by the North Central Association. Its rival is Brookfield Central High School, also located in Brookfield.

== Music ==
Brookfield East's music department received the Grammy "Signature Gold" award in the spring of 1999. Brookfield East was one of 16 schools selected of more than 1200 nationwide. The school also received a $5,000 grant, which was used to commission an original work for the school.

== Athletics ==
Brookfield East athletics currently belong to the Greater Metro Conference.

=== Conference affiliation history ===
- Braveland Conference (1962-1993)
- Woodland Conference (1993-1997)
- Greater Metro Conference (1997-present)

== Notable alumni ==
- Mike Caliendo, 2016, football player
- Mike Hoffmann, guitarist and recorder producer
- Dave Maxey, politician
- Pat McCurdy, musician
- Joe Panos, football player
- Martin P. Robinson, puppeteer on Sesame Street (1981–present)
- Sara Rodriguez, lieutenant governor and healthcare executive
- Leah Vukmir, 1976, state legislator (2002-2019)
