= Yipes! =

Yipes! is an American rock band from Milwaukee, Wisconsin.

== History ==
Band members Pat McCurdy, Mike Hoffmann, and Pete Strand had been playing together since 1971, but formed Yipes! in 1977 after the addition of Teddy Freese and Andy Bartel. After winning a battle of the bands contest, the group submitted a demo tape to Millennium Records, which signed the group. Their debut, self-titled album was issued in 1979, and a follow-up release appeared in 1980. During this time Yipes! opened for Cheap Trick, Foreigner, Kansas, and Jefferson Starship. In 1980, Yipes! charted in the Billboard Hot 100 with its cover of Beach Boys' song, Darlin'. The band was dropped from their label in 1981 and disbanded soon after.

Reviewing the band's debut LP in Christgau's Record Guide: Rock Albums of the Seventies (1981), Robert Christgau wrote: "This Wisconsin band is nowhere near as yucky as name and packaging suggest—how can you hate someone who complains that Californians 'got no ceilings on their cars'? Subjects of other cartoons—some simple-minded, some not—include class rivalry, being white, and the cold war. The problem is leader Pat McCurdy, who has one of those 'good rock voices' that enable the artiste to shout in tune but don't permit much nuance. You can almost see him curling his lip and raising his eyebrows whenever a joke comes up. Oh well."

In 2013, the group reunited to play at the Wisconsin Area Music Industry awards, and was inducted into their Hall of Fame. In 2014, the band reunited again for a concert at Milwaukee's Summerfest.

On May 16, 2015, Yipes! played their third show in 34 years at First Avenue in Minneapolis as part of a reunion/tribute show to the famed but long-closed Minneapolis punk bar Jay's Longhorn.

A third, new album was released on December 17, 2018 with the original lineup, entitled "Yipes!!!".

== Members ==
- Pat McCurdy - vocals
- Andy Bartel - guitar
- Mike Hoffmann - guitar
- Pete Strand - bass
- Teddy Freese - drums

== Discography ==
- Yipes! (Millennium Records, 1979) U.S. #177
- A Bit Irrational (Millennium Records, 1980)
- Yipes!!! (Yipes Records, 2018)
