= Linda Weavers =

American environmental engineer

- Born: Linda Kay Weavers
- Education: University of Minnesota (B.S., 1992); California Institute of Technology (M.S., 1994; Ph.D., 1998)
- Awards: Presidential Early Career Award (PECASE) (2001); NSF CAREER Award; AAUW Recognition Award for Emerging Scholars (2003); AEESP Distinguished Service Award (2012, 2018); President, Association of Environmental Engineering and Science Professors (AEESP)
- Engineering career
- Discipline: Environmental engineering, civil engineering, sonochemistry, hazardous waste remediation
- Practice name: Ohio State University (Professor); Ohio Water Resources Center (Co-Director)
- Projects: Ultrasonic remediation of per- and polyfluoroalkyl substances (PFAS); Ultrasonic and ozone nanobubble mitigation of harmful algal blooms Ozone Design Standards for Ohio Public Water Systems; Engineering summer camp for middle school girls (Founder)
- Significant design: Low-power acoustic cavitation and advanced oxidation systems for water treatment and membrane defouling

Linda Kay Weavers is an American environmental engineer specializing in water treatment, including the use of sonochemistry and ozone in water treatment and the study of emerging contaminants. She is a professor in the Department of Civil, Environmental and Geodetic Engineering at the Ohio State University, where she holds the John C. Geupel Endowed Chair and co-directs the Ohio Water Resources Center.

== Education and career ==
Weavers majored in civil engineering at the University of Minnesota, where she received her bachelor's degree in 1992. She continued her studies in environmental engineering science at the California Institute of Technology, received a master's degree in 1994, and completed her Ph.D. in 1998. Her dissertation, Enhancement of ultrasonic and ultraviolet irradiation with chemical oxidants, was supervised by Michael R. Hoffmann.

She joined the Ohio State University as an assistant professor in 1998. She was tenured as an associate professor and given the John C. Geupel Endowed Chair in 2003, and promoted to full professor in 2008.

She serves as the national President of the National Institutes for Water Resources (NIWR), leading a collaborative network of 54 water resources research institutes that cooperate with the U.S. Geological Survey (USGS) to coordinate federal water research and funding.

== Recognition ==
Weavers received the Presidential Early Career Award for Scientists and Engineers in 2001. The American Association of University Women gave her their Recognition Award for Emerging Scholars in 2003. The Association of Environmental Engineering and Science Professors gave her their Distinguished Service Award in 2012 and 2018, and named her as a fellow in 2021.
