= Joe Thuney =

American football player (born 1992)

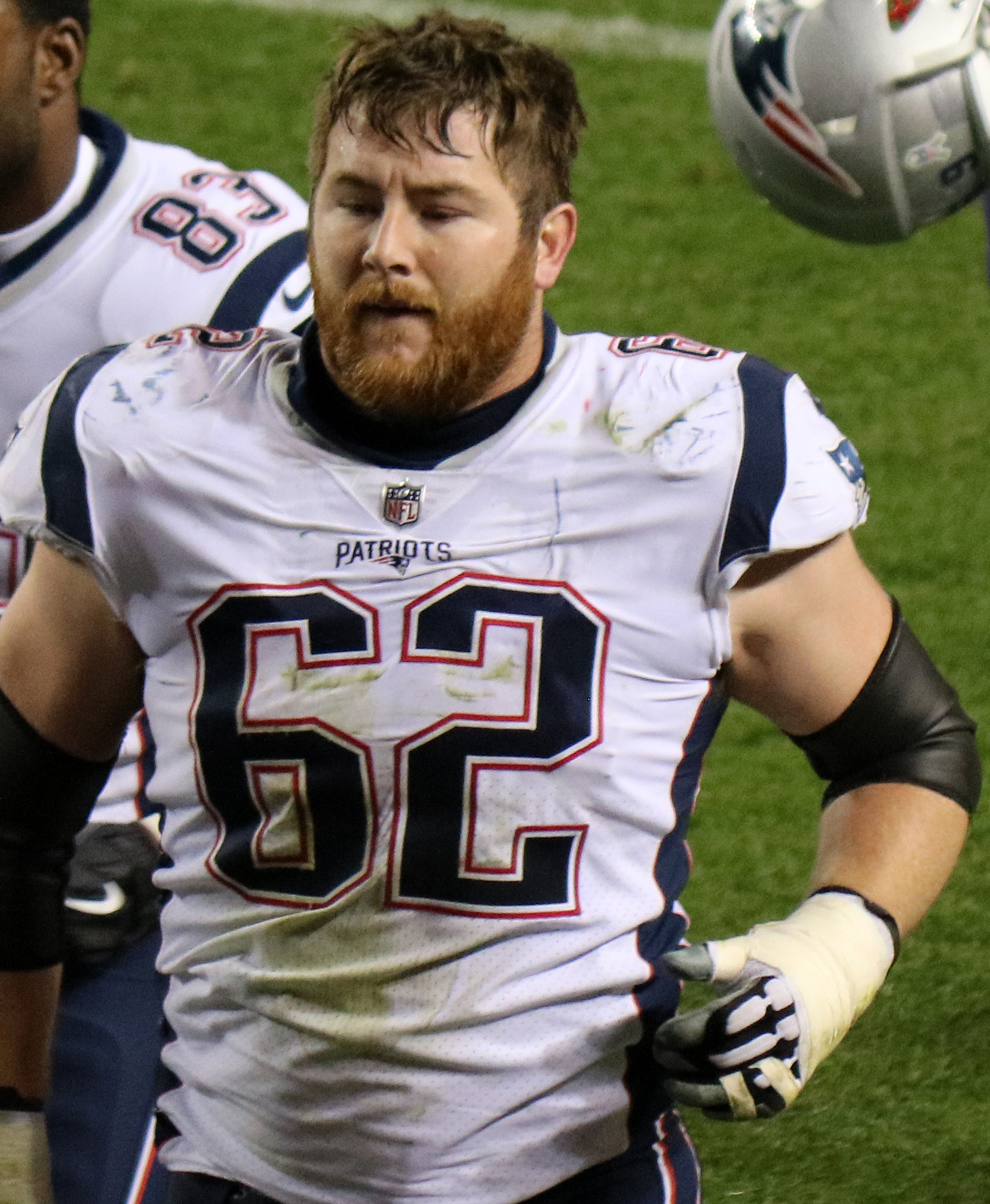
- Thuney with the New England Patriots in 2017

No. 62 – Chicago Bears
- Position: Guard
- Roster status: Active

Personal information
- Born: November 18, 1992 (age 33); Centerville, Ohio, U.S.
- Listed height: 6 ft 5 in (1.96 m)
- Listed weight: 301 lb (137 kg)

Career information
- High school: Archbishop Alter (Kettering, Ohio)
- College: NC State (2011–2015)
- NFL draft: 2016: 3rd round, 78th overall pick

Career history
- New England Patriots (2016–2020); Kansas City Chiefs (2021–2024); Chicago Bears (2025–present)

Awards and highlights
- 4× Super Bowl champion (LI, LIII, LVII, LVIII); NFL Protector of the Year (2025); 3× First-team All-Pro (2023–2025); 2× Second-team All-Pro (2019, 2022); 4× Pro Bowl (2022–2025); PFWA All-Rookie Team (2016); New England Patriots All-2010s Team; New England Patriots All-Dynasty Team; First-team All-American (2015); First-team All-ACC (2015)

Career NFL statistics as of Week 5, 2026
- Games played: 168
- Games started: 168
- Fumble recoveries: 2
- Stats at Pro Football Reference

Joseph Thuney (/ˈtuːni/ TOO-nee; born November 18, 1992) is an American professional football guard for the Chicago Bears of the National Football League (NFL). He played college football for the NC State Wolfpack, and was selected by the New England Patriots in the third round (78th overall) of the 2016 NFL draft. Thuney is the first player in NFL history to start in the Super Bowl in each of his first three seasons.

== Early life ==
Thuney was born to Mike and Beth Thuney in Centerville, Ohio. He was raised in Centerville along with his brother Eric and sisters Monica and Megan. Thuney attended Incarnation Catholic School before becoming a member of two D4 state championship teams at Archbishop Alter High School. As a Senior he was Greater Catholic League Lineman of the Year and president of his senior class.

== College career ==
Thuney played sparingly at NC State during his freshman year. He came into his redshirt sophomore year as the projected starting center but ended up starting the season opener at right tackle, the second game at right guard and the last 10 games at left tackle. In his junior year he started at left guard and at left tackle his senior year. He became the first offensive lineman for NC State to be named an All-American since Jim Ritcher in 1979.

He was a finalist for the Campbell Trophy, which rewards the best combination of academics, community service, and performance on the field, and he graduated from NC State cum laude in three years. According to NFL reporter Matt Verderame, when Thuney took the Wonderlic Personnel Test he avoided answering many of the questions so he would not come off as too smart. He later earned Master of Business Administration from Kelley School of Business at Indiana University Bloomington.

In 2026, Thuney was inducted into the NC State Football Ring of Honor.

== Professional career ==
Pre-draft measurables
Height	Weight	Arm length	Hand span	Wingspan	40-yard dash	10-yard split	20-yard split	20-yard shuttle	Three-cone drill	Vertical jump	Broad jump	Bench press
6 ft 4 5/8 in (1.95 m)	304 lb (138 kg)	32 1/4 in (0.82 m)	9 5/8 in (0.24 m)	6 ft 7 in (2.01 m)	4.95 s	1.70 s	2.84 s	4.54 s	7.47 s	28.5 in (0.72 m)	9 ft 2 in (2.79 m)	28 reps
All values from NFL Combine

=== New England Patriots ===
Thuney was selected by the Patriots in the third round of the 2016 NFL draft with the 78th overall selection, 13 picks before the Patriots drafted his teammate, quarterback Jacoby Brissett. Thuney won the starting left guard spot to start the season and remained the starter for all 16 regular-season games; according to Pro-Football-Reference.com, he played the highest number of snaps of any Patriot in 2016. He also started all three postseason games. On February 5, 2017, Thuney was part of the Patriots team that won Super Bowl LI. In the game, the Patriots defeated the Atlanta Falcons by a score of 34–28 in overtime. The PFWA named Thuney to its 2016 All-Rookie Team at guard. Thuney made it to his second straight Super Bowl when the Patriots defeated the Jacksonville Jaguars in the AFC Championship Game. The Patriots failed to repeat as Super Bowl champions when they lost 41–33 to the Philadelphia Eagles.

Thuney once again started all 16 games at left guard for the Patriots in 2018 and reached Super Bowl LIII, becoming the first player in NFL history to start in the Super Bowl in each of his first three seasons. The Patriots defeated the Los Angeles Rams 13–3 to win their second title in three years. Thuney played every offensive snap for the team and helped contain Defensive Player of the Year Aaron Donald.

The Patriots placed the franchise tag on Thuney on March 16, 2020. He signed the franchise tag on March 20.

In 2020, with David Andrews out on injured reserve, Thuney was pressed into service at center for the Patriots' Week 3 game against the Las Vegas Raiders.

=== Kansas City Chiefs ===
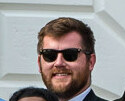
Thuney in 2023

Thuney signed a five-year, $80 million contract with the Kansas City Chiefs on March 18, 2021. Thuney continued to play left guard for the Chiefs during the 2022 NFL season. The Chiefs would go on to Super Bowl LVII where Thuney helped to hold the Philadelphia Eagles defense in check, as the offensive line gave up zero sacks and the Chiefs defeated the Eagles 38–35. This was his third Super Bowl ring and first with the Chiefs. In 2023, Thuney was named First-team All-Pro. In the Divisional Round against the Buffalo Bills, Thuney had a pectoral injury that sidelined him for the rest of the playoffs. Without Thuney, the Chiefs won Super Bowl LVIII 25–22 against the San Francisco 49ers to give Thuney his fourth Super Bowl championship.

On July 17, 2024, Thuney was placed on the Active/Physically Unable to Perform (PUP) list. He was activated off of the list on July 28, 2024. In Week 15, following an injury to newly signed tackle D. J. Humphries, Thuney switched to playing left tackle. Mike Caliendo took Thuney's place at left guard, and this arrangement continued throughout the postseason. In the 2024 NFL season, Thuney helped the Chiefs reach Super Bowl LIX, but he gave up 7 pressures and a sack, and the team lost 40–22 to the Eagles.

=== Chicago Bears ===
On March 12, 2025, the Chiefs traded Thuney to the Chicago Bears in exchange for a fourth-round pick (No. 125, which was traded to his former Patriots) in the 2026 NFL draft. On May 20, Thuney signed a two-year, $35 million contract with Chicago that runs through the 2027 season.

In Thuney's first season as a Bear, the offensive line went from allowing 68 sacks in 2024 to just 24. He was named first-team All-Pro for a third consecutive season and to his fourth Pro Bowl roster; Thuney was the team's first interior offensive lineman to receive the former honor since center Jay Hilgenberg in 1989 and their first guard since Dick Barwegen in 1951. In the Divisional Round against the Los Angeles Rams, Thuney was moved to left tackle following an injury to Ozzy Trapilo, with Jordan McFadden taking his place at left guard. At the 15th NFL Honors, Thuney received the inaugural NFL Protector of the Year Award.

Thuney remained the starting left guard in 2026, though the retirement of center Drew Dalman led to the Bears trading for his former NC State teammate Garrett Bradbury. In Week 7 against the Patriots, the Bears ran a trick play in which quarterback Caleb Williams gave the ball to Thuney, who ran for a four-yard gain; since Thuney was in front of Williams when the exchange happened, they were penalized for an illegal forward hand-off, the first time such a penalty was called since 2010.

=== Regular season statistics ===
Legend
	Won the Super Bowl
	AP NFL Protector of the Year
**Bold**	Career high

Year	Team	Games		Offense					
Year	Team	GP	GS	Snaps	Pct	Holding	False Start	Decl/Pen	Acpt/Pen
2016	NE	16	16	1,114	100%	**6**	**3**	**1**	**9**
2017	NE	16	16	1,134	100%	2	0	0	3
2018	NE	16	16	1,119	100%	3	1	0	4
2019	NE	16	16	1,140	99%	0	0	0	0
2020	NE	16	16	979	97%	3	0	0	3
2021	KC	17	17	**1,185**	99%	4	**3**	**1**	7
2022	KC	15	15	999	98%	1	1	0	2
2023	KC	17	17	1,087	97%	0	1	0	2
2024	KC	17	17	1,117	97%	1	0	0	1
2025	CHI	17	17	1,149	100%	0	2	0	2
2026	CHI	5	5	383	100%	0	0	0	0
Career		168	168	11,416	—	19	11	2	33

=== Postseason ===
Year	Team	Games		Offense					
Year	Team	GP	GS	Snaps	Pct	Holding	False Start	Decl/Pen	Acpt/Pen
2016	NE	3	3	241	94%	0	0	0	0
2017	NE	3	3	221	93%	0	0	0	0
2018	NE	3	3	**252**	94%	**1**	0	0	**1**
2019	NE	1	1	61	95%	0	0	0	0
2021	KC	3	3	210	92%	0	0	0	0
2022	KC	3	3	192	100%	0	0	0	0
2023	KC	2	2	116	100%	0	0	0	0
2024	KC	3	3	173	100%	0	0	0	0
2025	CHI	2	2	159	100%	0	0	0	0
Career		23	23	1,625	—	1	0	0	1
