= Pat McCurdy =

American musician

- Occupation: Singer-songwriter
- Instruments: Vocals, guitar
- Years active: 1977–present

Pat McCurdy is an American singer-songwriter from Milwaukee, Wisconsin.

== Biography ==
McCurdy was influenced at an early age by the first appearance of The Beatles on The Ed Sullivan Show. After teaching himself guitar and participating in several high school bands, he went on to front Yipes! in the late 1970s, formed with fellow University of Wisconsin students. Often described as a power pop or new wave band, Yipes! enjoyed some moderate success after being signed to RCA/Millennium in 1978. However, the label dropped the band after only a few years. He has two sons, Julian and Miles.

== Career ==
McCurdy spent most of the 1980s fronting several bands. The Men About Town (which included several members of Yipes!), Mankind, and The Confidentials all enjoyed minor success touring the Midwest. It was not until late in the eighties, when McCurdy decided to take tentative steps into performing solo, that he managed to find his real niche.

Performing initially for sparse audiences in small bars, he honed his act to what could be described as "interactive goofiness". For example, his tributes to the 1980s and 1990s are among his most popular segments. These medleys, consisting largely of one-hit wonders from those respective decades, invoke a sort of call-and-response with the crowd, where McCurdy sings a line or two from each song, cueing the audience to continue that bit. This style quickly attracted a devoted cult following of fans, many of whom would (and still do) attend his shows on a weekly basis. McCurdy's act has also brought increased involvement of his sound and light man, Jim "Pipe Jim" Schafelburger, an entertaining aspect in its own right. Over time, the audiences became less sparse and the bars became less small, thanks mainly to word-of-mouth marketing.

McCourdy regularly tours the upper Midwestern United States, with stops in Milwaukee, Madison, Chicago, Green Bay, and Minneapolis.[5] His shows typically feature only himself and his guitar, with improvised audience interaction. He performs over 300 shows per year. His catalog of original songs exceeds 600 and covers topics including relationships, politics, daily life, and humor.[1]

In 2008, he was asked by the Green Bay Packers to write a song to play in their stadium. Originally objecting because he did not like sports songs, he went on to write "I Love the Green and Gold," eventually making it into a music video starring himself and featuring Larry the Cable Guy. After the Packers won Super Bowl XLV, he wrote a follow-up song entitled "The Trophy Song."

During the 2020 Coronavirus pandemic, McCurdy performed 15 consecutive Friday evening "Shelter in Place" shows on Facebook. The shows were streamed live from his home in Wisconsin for tens of thousands of viewers from all around the world. Each show lasted about 90 minutes and featured a different drinking word, unique song requests (including several that Pat had not played in over 25 years) and shout outs and thank yous to fans. The performances often featured cameos by longtime manager Brian "Murf" Murphy, sound wizard Jim "Pipe Jim" Schaufelberger, Kimmy Unger from The WhiskeyBelles and members of McCurdy's family.

== Discography ==
with Yipes!

- Yipes! (1979)
- A Bit Irrational (1980)
- Yipes!!! (2018)

with The Confidentials

- How To Love And Be Loved (1985)
- The Good Life! (1988)

Solo albums

- Memorial Day (1989)
- The Sound of Music (1991)
- Pat in Person (1992)
- Show Tunes (1995)
- The Big Bright Beautiful World of Pat McCurdy (1997)
- Pat in Person Volume 2 (1998)
- Fainting With Happiness (2000)
- My World of Love (2003)
- 15 Favorites (2007, compilation)
- Love is a Beautiful Thing (2012)
- Pat McCurdy Now! (2014)
- Souvenirs (2017, compilation)
- Now is Not the Time for Sad Songs: A Pandemic 2020 Souvenir (2020)
