= Michael Hofmann (footballer, born 1971) =

Swiss footballer

Personal information
- Date of birth: 23 April 1971 (age 55)
- Position: Defender

Senior career*
Years	Team	Apps	(Gls)
–1989	FC Sion		
1992–1994	FC Bulle		
1994	Yverdon Sport FC		
- * Club domestic league appearances and goals

Michael Hofmann (born 23 April 1971) is a retired Swiss football defender.
