= Mike Caliendo =

American football player (born 1997)

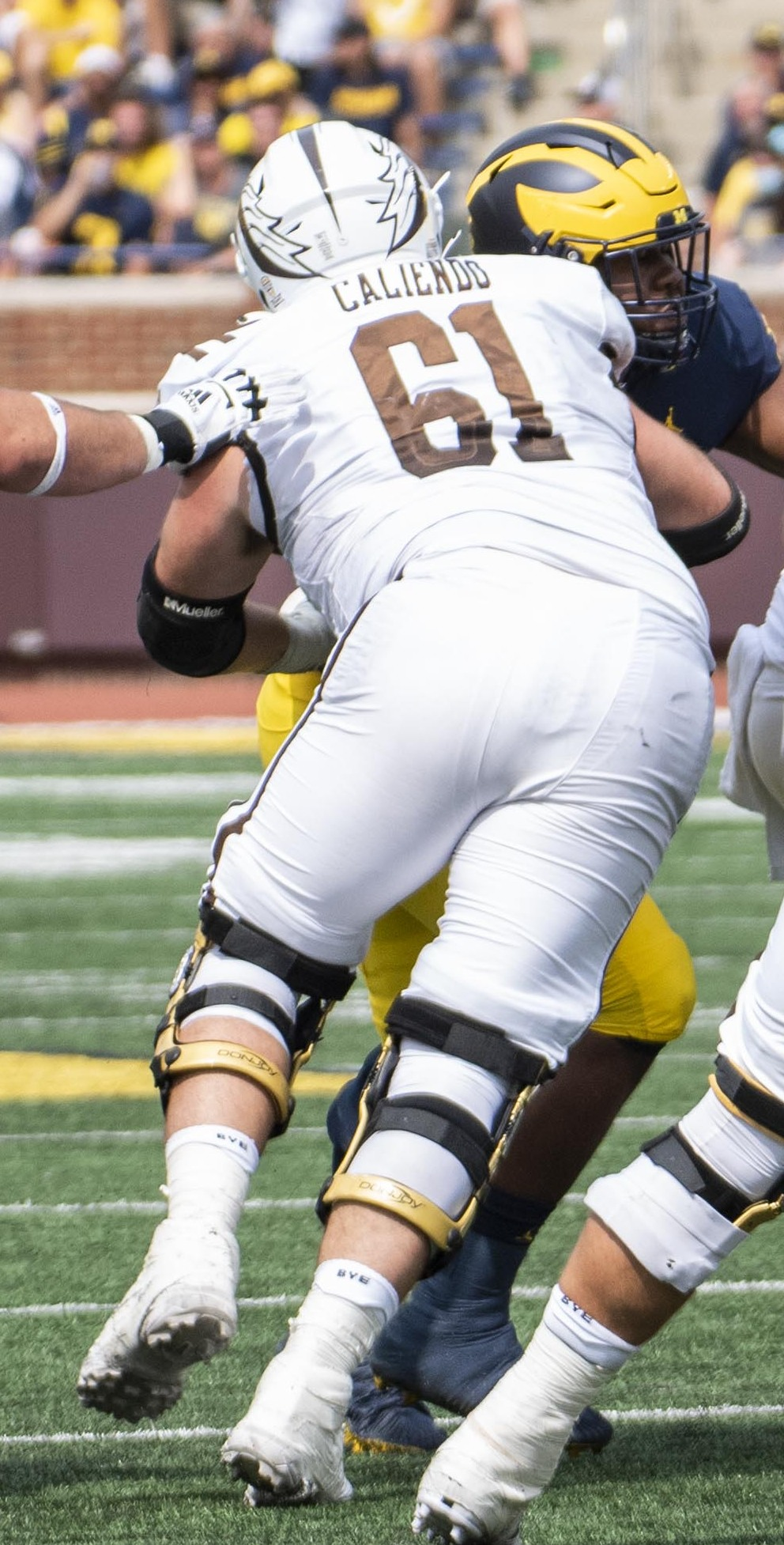
- Caliendo with Western Michigan in 2021

No. 66 – Kansas City Chiefs
- Position: Guard
- Roster status: Active

Personal information
- Born: October 21, 1997 (age 29); Brookfield, Wisconsin, U.S.
- Listed height: 6 ft 4 in (1.93 m)
- Listed weight: 301 lb (137 kg)

Career information
- High school: Brookfield East
- College: Western Michigan (2016–2021)
- NFL draft: 2022: undrafted

Career history
- Kansas City Chiefs (2022–present)

Awards and highlights
- 2× Super Bowl champion (LVII, LVIII); 2× First-team All-MAC (2020, 2021)

Career NFL statistics as of 2025
- Games played: 42
- Games started: 7
- Stats at Pro Football Reference

Mike Caliendo (born October 21, 1997) is an American professional football guard for the Kansas City Chiefs of the National Football League (NFL). He played college football for the Western Michigan Broncos and was signed by the Chiefs as an undrafted free agent in 2022.

== Early life and college ==
Caliendo was born on October 21, 1997. He attended Brookfield East High School in Wisconsin where he was team captain as a senior. He was named the team's most valuable player as well as Associated Press first-team all-state following his final season on the team. He was an all-conference scholar athlete and was named Greater Metro Conference Offensive Lineman of the Year. Caliendo was a three-star prospect and was the eleventh-best prospect in the state according to ESPN.

Caliendo committed to Western Michigan University (WMU) but did not see any playing time as a true freshman in 2016. In 2017, he appeared on 777 snaps, playing in all 12 games (10 as a starter) and earning academic all-conference. He was a Mid-American Conference (MAC) Distinguished Scholar-Athlete and helped his school to rank among the top MAC teams in several categories, including points-per-game with 33.9 (3rd in the MAC), rushing yards per-game with 224.8 (2nd in the MAC), fewest turnovers lost with 18 (3rd in the MAC), third down conversion percentage with .395 (3rd in the MAC), and conversion percentage on fourth downs with .600 (3rd in the MAC). Western Michigan was among the top 35 teams nationally in points per game, rushing yards per game, and fewest passes intercepted and fourth down conversion percentage.

For his third season, 2018, Caliendo again earned academic all-conference honors as well as MAC Distinguished Scholar-Athlete honors. He was a starter in all 13 games, playing on 900 snaps, and helped block for the WMU running game which scored 32 touchdowns and had a 199.46 rushing yards per-game average, which was third best in the conference. He helped the team rank high among the MAC teams in several offensive statistical categories, including fewest sacks allowed per game (1.54, 2nd place in the MAC), average time of possession (33:36, best in the MAC), average passing yards per game (237.4, 3rd in the MAC), fewest turnovers (19, 4th in the MAC), fewest interceptions (9, 4th in the MAC), fewest TFLs allowed per game (5.15, 4th in the MAC), total offensive yards per game (436.8, 3rd in the MAC), points per game (32.0, 4th in the MAC), and total first downs (296, 4th in the MAC). The team ranked top-50 in the nation for fewest sacks allowed per game (38th), fewest passes intercepted (43rd), points per game (38th), rushing yards per game (38th), offensive yards per game (35th), first downs (31st), average time of possession (6th), and fewest TFLs allowed per game (32nd).

In 2019, Caliendo was named second-team all-conference, academic all-conference, first-team CoSIDA academic all-district five, and a distinguished conference scholar-athlete after starting in 13 games for Western Michigan. He appeared on 967 total snaps and played a part in WMU ranking top three in the MAC for offensive yards per game with 445.7 (2nd), third down conversion percentage with .453 (2nd), fewest lost fumbles with 6 (2nd), fewest total turnovers with 14 (2nd), and most points per game with 33.1 (3rd). He helped them rank top 30 in the nation for fewest turnovers (20th), points per game (30th), rushing yards per game (28th), fewest lost fumbles (26th), third down conversion percentage (23rd), and total yards offensively per game (25th). The WMU offense ranked third in the MAC and placed 18th in the country for fewest allowed sacks per game with 1.38.

Caliendo was named CoSIDA Academic All-American, All-District, Academic All-MAC, first-team All-MAC, and a MAC Distinguished Scholar-Athlete in a COVID-19-shortened 2020 season. He was a starter in each of the six games played, and appeared on a total of 397 snaps. Pro Football Focus named him the team's top run-blocker. He did not allow any sacks in the season and helped the team rank top ten in the nation for points per game.

Caliendo turned down a chance in the NFL and medical school to return to the WMU football team in 2021. Before the season started, he was named to the preseason Wuerffel Trophy watchlist. He started every game (12) for the 2021 Western Michigan team at center, despite previously playing at guard. He helped them win seven of twelve games and finish second in the conference for total yards of offensive per game (463.8). He was named first-team all-conference and was a finalist for the William V. Campbell Trophy, "the Academic Heisman".

Caliendo graduated in 2019 with a GPA of 3.90 in biomedical studies. He was named a National Football Foundation (NFF) National Scholar-Athlete in 2021.

== Professional career ==
Pre-draft measurables
Height	Weight	Arm length	Hand span	Wingspan	40-yard dash	10-yard split	20-yard split	20-yard shuttle	Three-cone drill	Vertical jump	Broad jump
6 ft 4 in (1.93 m)	300 lb (136 kg)	30 7/8 in (0.78 m)	9 1/2 in (0.24 m)	6 ft 5 in (1.96 m)	5.36 s	1.79 s	3.05 s	4.72 s	7.68 s	28.5 in (0.72 m)	8 ft 9 in (2.67 m)
All values from Pro Day

After going unselected in the 2022 NFL draft, Caliendo was signed by the Kansas City Chiefs as an undrafted free agent. He was waived on August 30, 2022. The following day, he was signed to the practice squad. Caliendo became a Super Bowl champion when the Chiefs defeated the Philadelphia Eagles in Super Bowl LVII. He signed a reserve/future contract on February 15, 2023. Caliendo won his second Super Bowl ring when the Chiefs defeated the San Francisco 49ers 25–22 in Super Bowl LVIII.

On March 11, 2024, Caliendo re-signed with Kansas City. After starting left guard Joe Thuney moved to left tackle, Caliendo recorded 3 starts in the regular season, as well as starting for the duration of the Chiefs playoff run during the 2024 season, including their loss in Super Bowl LIX.

On March 14, 2026, Caliendo re-signed with the Chiefs on a one-year, $1.35 million contract.

== Personal life ==
Caliendo's uncle, Chris, was a linebacker at Nebraska and was an honorable mention all-conference selection. Another uncle, Cary, was a first-team freshman All-America selection at Northern Illinois.
