= Riteway Bus Service =

Go Riteway Transportation Group
- Founded: 1957
- Headquarters: Richfield, Washington County, Wisconsin, U.S.
- Website: www.goriteway.com

Go Riteway Transportation Group is a motor coach, limo coach, black car, commuter coach, and school bus service provider based in Oak Creek, Wisconsin, United States. Go Riteway Transportation Group, founded in 1957, is now in its third generation of family management.

Go Riteway school bus division was started in 1957, by Rollie and Pearl Bast, with four school buses serving the Germantown School District. GO Riteway's 1,600 employees operate out of over 25 locations across the Midwest with a fleet of 1,300 vehicles that includes school buses, motor coaches, shuttle coaches, limo coaches, executive sedans and vans.

In July 2011 the company changed its name from Riteway Bus Service to Go Riteway Transportation Group.

It operates school bus and charter services in Wisconsin and Illinois.
