= Mike Hoffmann =

American musician (died 2021)

Mike Hoffmann (1953/1954 – October 24, 2021) was an American guitarist and record producer. He is known for performing with the band Yipes! and as a producer with The Verve Pipe, Willy Porter, Paul Cebar and Violent Femmes co-founder Victor DeLorenzo.

== Biography ==
Hoffmann was a graduate of Brookfield East High School in Brookfield, Wisconsin. The youngest of three children of Janet and Fred Hoffmann, he started playing in bands in high school.

He was the guitarist in the Milwaukee power pop band Yipes! The band had two albums with Millennium Records distributed by RCA Records. Yipes! charted in the Billboard Hot 100 with its 1980 cover of the Beach Boys' "Darlin'".

Hoffmann played bass for Marshall Crenshaw on tour, and opened for acts such as Foreigner, Kansas, Jefferson Starship, Lou Reed, The Clash, Cheap Trick, The Replacements and Wilco. He recorded albums overseen by noted producers such as Nick Lowe, Mitchell Froom, Chris Thomas and Jerry Harrison of Talking Heads. Hoffmann also recorded with artists such as Herb Alpert, T Bone Burnett, k. d. lang and drummer Hal Blaine.

Hoffmann was twice inducted into the Wisconsin Area Music Industry Hall of Fame, in 2013 with the band Yipes!, and in 2021 as part of the group Semi-Twang.

He played in the group Carnival Strippers, which had their music featured in the action movie Speed.

Hoffmann died at the age of 67 on October 24, 2021 from a pulmonary embolism.
