= Michael R. Hoffmann =

American environmental engineer

- Education: Northwestern University; Brown University
- Scientific career
- Workplaces: Caltech
- Doctoral students: Linda Weavers

Michael R. Hoffmann is an American environmental engineer. He is currently the John S. and Sherry Chen Professor of Environmental Science at the California Institute of Technology. He is one of the most highly cited engineering researchers in the world.

Hoffman obtained his bachelor's degree from Northwestern University and a doctorate from Brown University, followed by postdoctoral research at the California Institute of Technology. He subsequently joined the faculty of the University of Minnesota until 1980, when he returned to Caltech as an associate professor. Hoffman attained full professor status in 1986, and was named James Irvine Professor of Environmental Science in 1996. In 2016, Hoffman became Theodore Y. Wu Professor of Environmental Science, which he held until his 2018 appointment as John S. and Sherry Chen Professor of Environmental Science. In 2011, Hoffman was elected member of the United States National Academy of Engineering "for oxidative treatment technologies for the removal of organic and inorganic contaminants from water." He was elected an academician of the Chinese Academy of Engineering in 2017.
