= Hockey IQ =

An ice hockey player's cognitive skills

Hockey IQ, also called hockey intelligence or hockey sense, is an ice hockey player's in-game cognitive skills, often those related to anticipating and predicting plays, decision-making, and overall understanding of the game. The exact definition of the term varies.

While the terms hockey sense and hockey IQ are mostly used interchangeably, USA Hockey describes the difference being that hockey sense indicates a player's perception and intuition, while hockey IQ is a player's knowledge of the game.

Opinions vary on whether hockey IQ can be taught, with conventional wisdom often stipulating that the trait is innate. However, coaches at various levels of the sport have challenged this idea and sought to improve players' hockey IQ. The development of hockey IQ may be facilitated through practice that requires players to use decision-making skills, rather than solely rote exercises. The Ontario Minor Hockey Association recommends small area games to develop hockey IQ. Montreal Canadiens head coach Martin St. Louis met with players for one-on-one video sessions to improve their hockey IQ. Footage may also be used to assess players' hockey IQ.

== See also ==
- Football IQ
- Glossary of ice hockey terms
- IntelliGym
- Playmaker – playing role in association football
