= Football IQ =

Football player's intelligence related to the sport

Football IQ or football intelligence is a concept in American football regarding a player's intelligence related to the sport. Often times, a player's football IQ is of particular concern depending on their position. For instance, the trait is considered important for quarterbacks. Player intelligence has also been assessed in scouting and pre-draft procedures.

== Description and overview ==
Football IQ involves understanding concepts and strategies of American football. Players with a high football IQ can assist with a team's game plan. Joe Burrow was noted to be like a "co-offensive coordinator" during his time at LSU, often changing his receiver's route based on defensive formations. In the NFL, rookies have been noted as sometimes experiencing difficulty adjusting to the pro game from college, with football IQ often presenting a challenge. Rookies who showcase high football IQs have thus been noted by coaches as impressive. Veteran players are seen as key contributors for successful teams; Tampa Bay Buccaneers head coach Bruce Arians called having a smart and experienced team a "huge" value in the NFL playoffs.

A physically demanding game, football players' bodies will physically decline over their careers. However, football IQ can remain a strength through this physical decline; Peyton Manning has been cited by his peers as one such example of this. Often identified as an example of a quarterback with a high football IQ, the trait became one of Manning's "defining characteristics". It also helped his performance elevate above quarterbacks with similar or greater physical capabilities.

== Research ==
In sport psychology, two lines of research relate to football IQ: whether knowing the game changes how a person judges a play, and whether cognitive test scores predict how well a player performs.

People with more football experience called pass interference less often in a 2015 experiment. The experiment compared three groups of 16: college students who had never played football, players on the University of Pennsylvania varsity team, and NCAA football officials with an average of about 19 years of experience. Each person looked at 190 photographs of a receiver and a defender contesting a pass and decided whether the defender had committed pass interference. The group with no football background made an average of 93.3 calls, compared with 72.6 for the players and 62.5 for the officials. The authors concluded that understanding the concepts behind a call may lead people to apply stricter standards before making it. They noted that the study used still photographs rather than video.

Quarterbacks with better reaction time scores before the NFL draft tended to have more productive NFL careers, according to a 2025 study. It examined 42 quarterbacks who took the Athletic Intelligence Quotient during pre-draft evaluations between 2014 and 2020. The test, given on behalf of NFL teams by the company AIM LLC, uses a tablet to measure visual spatial processing, reaction time, decision-making, and learning efficiency. Better reaction time scores predicted higher career value (measured by Pro Football Reference's Approximate Value), higher quarterback ratings, more games started per year, and more rushing yards per game. Reaction time accounted for 6 to 13 percent more of the variation in these outcomes than draft position alone. Better visual spatial processing scores predicted more passing yards per game. The authors noted that the sample was small and at risk of sampling bias, and that they did not measure coaching, offensive line play, or team scheme.

Research outside football has looked at athletes more broadly. Athletes as a group scored better than non-athletes on measures of inhibitory control and working memory, according to a 2025 meta-analysis of 41 studies covering 3,845 athletes. Elite athletes outscored amateur athletes on cognitive flexibility, and sports requiring rapid adaptation to changing conditions showed larger advantages than sports that do not. The authors reported possible publication bias in the inhibitory control results, while the working memory and cognitive flexibility findings held up under sensitivity analysis.

== Positions ==
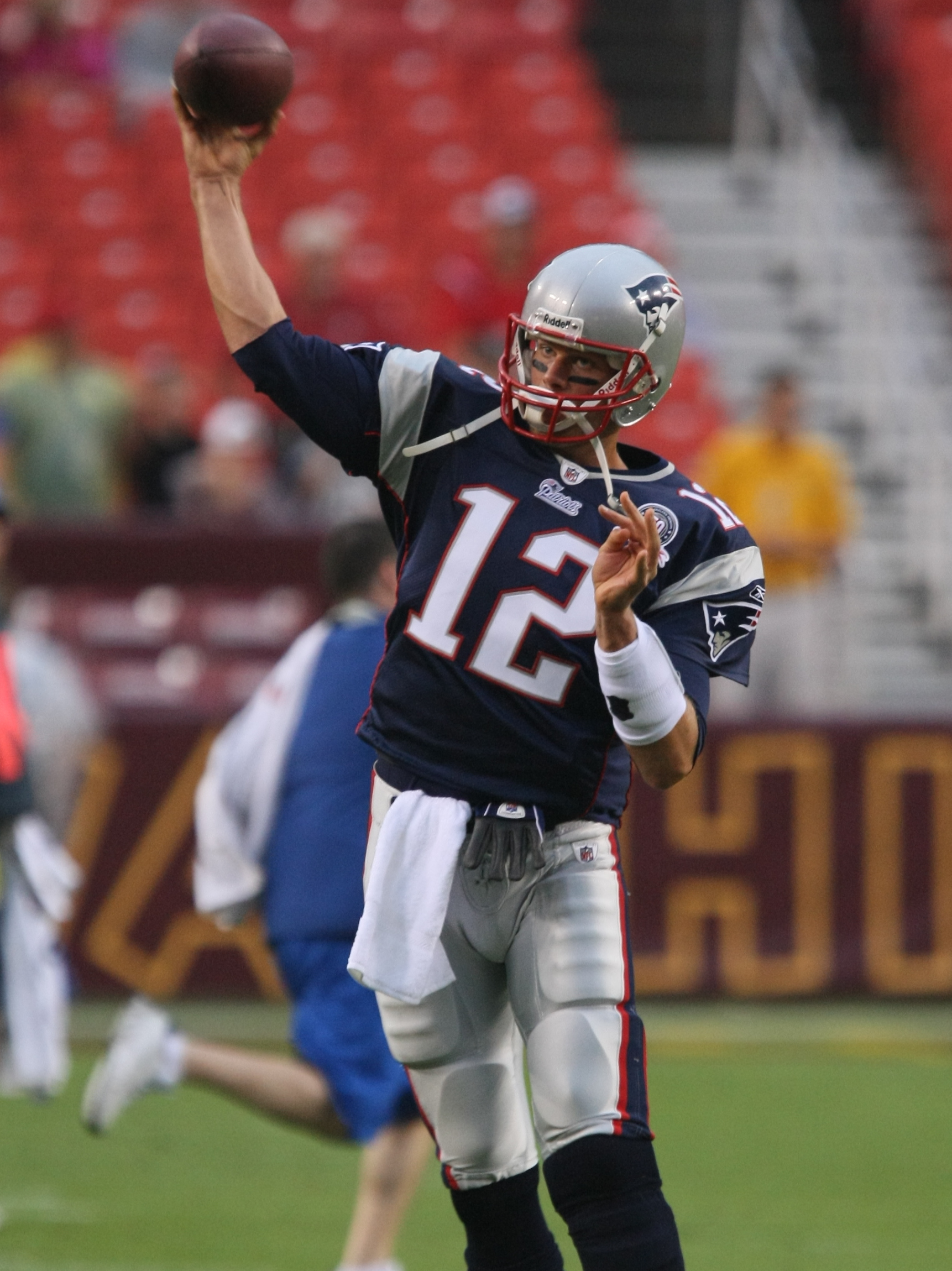
Quarterback Tom Brady has been noted for his high football IQ.

A high football IQ is often seen as a requirement for National Football League (NFL) quarterbacks, especially those considered franchise quarterbacks. Being able to analyze opposing defenses quickly and good in-game decision making are associated with having a high football IQ. In-game, quick processing of opposing defenses is a positive trait for quarterbacks. This processing is a factor both pre- and post-snap. Tom Brady's football IQ has been often discussed by general fans, sportswriters, opposing players, and football analysts alike. Sports Illustrated writer Andy Benoit wrote:

A QB is taught to play along the "midline"—the imaginary lane directly behind the center. Sloppy QBs will drift off the midline in their dropback, or they'll hitch out of the midline upon finishing their dropback. This is never true of Brady. Brady only moves off the midline when necessary. And because he's so calm dropping back and has such a keen sense for reading defensive fronts before and after the snap, he often senses that necessity beforehand. This speaks to his football IQ, but it's also a uniquely difficult physical trait.

Although much of the discussion of football IQ is focused on the quarterback position, the trait is assessed for other positions. During the 1970s, middle linebacker, safety, center were all considered "thinking" positions. Football IQ is considered important for middle (or "mike") linebackers, in particular. Due to this, mike linebackers are often called the "quarterback of the defense". Writing on a high school mike linebacker's highlights, Sports Illustrated writer Evan Crowell stated that "communicating the play call with confused teammates [is] an encouraging sign for a high school junior." Crowell continued to write "most inside linebacker play at the next [college] level is getting yourself in the correct position before the ball is snapped."

Offensive linemen are also associated with a high football IQ. Mark Beech of Sports Illustrated called offensive linemen "thinking men", noting how their role includes processing defensive formations and alignments, as well as constant thought behind footwork mechanics and hip positioning "for optimum leverage". Beech continued, writing "It is widely believed by coaches and NFL executives that offensive linemen are among the smartest players on the field." Regarding the football intelligence of offensive linemen, college football coach Joe Lee Dunn stated:

Yeah, they're smarter, but they're smarter because they have to be. On defense we teach recklessness, whereas over on that side of the ball they're teaching things like finesse and footwork. Thirty years ago most offenses ran the I formation, and blocking was pretty straightforward. But these days you've got spread offenses and calls being made from the sideline. The passing game has taken over college offenses. When that happened, it got pretty complicated for offensive linemen.

The aforementioned rookie struggle to adjust from college to the pros due to lesser football IQ has been noted to be particularly prevalent for wide receivers. Former NFL head coach Brian Billick noted that "running disciplined routes (both in terms of positioning and timing) and mastering the myriad sight adjustments and choice routes that are a big part of the modern pro game" as among some difficult aspects of a wide receiver's adjustment process. New England Patriots head coach Bill Belichick cited Deion Branch as "one of the smartest receivers" during his tenure with the team.

== Assessment in scouting ==
=== College ===
Football IQ has been documented to be assessed in the recruitment of players by college football programs. In 2011, Los Angeles Times writer Matt Stevens stated that "Defining the multiple parts of athletic intelligence, identifying it in an athlete and recruiting accordingly is a complex and tedious task." Stevens went on to write that "players' intense focus on football may help explain why the sport has a reputation for fielding proportionally more low-performing students."

=== NFL ===
In the 1970s, the Wonderlic test caught on in the NFL's assessment of players. A measurement of cognitive ability and problem-solving skills, the Wonderlic was part of scouting processes prior in the lead up to the NFL draft. Prospective quarterbacks were required to take the Wonderlic.

This assessment was found to be a failed predictor of NFL success in a 2009 Human Performance study by Brian D. Lyons, Brian J. Hoffman, and John W. Michel. Economists David Berri and Rob Simmons also found Wonderlic scores as "all but useless as predictors." The Wonderlic also was criticized for racial bias. A 2011 study by two Cal State Fullerton economics professors found a discrepancy in the rise of draft positions between white and black players regarding an increase from the 25th to the 75th percentile in a Wonderlic score. History, African American studies, and Africana studies professor Derrick White of the University of Kentucky stated that the test likely contributed to placing players in certain positions according to racial stereotypes, a practice called "stacking".

During the 2010s, the NFL and its teams began to adopt other assessments "that claim to gauge how quickly players pick up football-specific concepts and assess behavioral tendencies" in order to discern a player's potential success in the league. The NFL debuted the Player Assessment Test at its 2013 Scouting Combine. A computerized test created by Cyrus Mehri of the Fritz Pollard Alliance, the test measures attributes like aggressiveness alongside cognitive traits. The NFL did not officially administer the Wonderlic at Scouting Combine in 2022.

== See also ==
- Hockey IQ
