= Human performance =

Human performance or Human Performance can refer to:

== Science ==
- Human performance, the subject of study by performance science
- Human performance, an alternative name for human reliability in human factors and ergonomics
- Human performance technology, in process improvement methodologies
- Human performance modeling, a method of quantifying human behavior, cognition, and processes

== Media ==
- Human Performance, a 2016 album by American band Parquet Courts
- Human Performance (journal), a scientific journal covering industrial and organizational psychology as it relates to job performance

== Other uses ==
- Human Performance Center, a multi-purpose arena on the campus of the University of New Orleans

== See also ==
- Job performance
