= Joe Burrow =

American football player (born 1996)

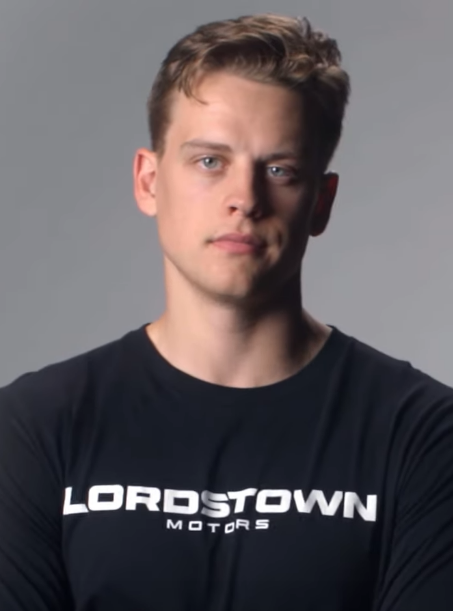
- Burrow in 2022

No. 9 – Cincinnati Bengals
- Position: Quarterback
- Roster status: Active

Personal information
- Born: December 10, 1996 (age 29); Ames, Iowa, U.S.
- Listed height: 6 ft 4 in (1.93 m)
- Listed weight: 215 lb (98 kg)

Career information
- High school: Athens (The Plains, Ohio)
- College: Ohio State (2015–2017) LSU (2018–2019)
- NFL draft: 2020: 1st round, 1st overall pick

Career history
- Cincinnati Bengals (2020–present)

Awards and highlights
- 2× NFL Comeback Player of the Year (2021, 2024); 3× Pro Bowl (2022, 2024, 2025); NFL passing touchdowns leader (2024); NFL passing yards leader (2024); NFL completion percentage leader (2021); CFP national champion (2019); CFP National Championship Offensive MVP (2019); Heisman Trophy (2019); NCAA passing touchdowns leader (2019); NCAA passing yards leader (2019); NFL records: Career completion percentage: 69.1% (Note: minimum 1,500 pass attempts); Pass completions per game (career): 25.3; NCAA (FBS) records: Offensive yards in a season: 6,055; Touchdowns responsible for in a season: 65 (tied) (Note: With Bailey Zappe)

Career NFL statistics as of Week 10, 2026
- Passing attempts: 3,146
- Passing completions: 2,175
- Completion percentage: 69.1%
- TD–INT: 184–57
- Passing yards: 23,605
- Passer rating: 102.9
- Rushing yards: 932
- Rushing touchdowns: 15
- Stats at Pro Football Reference

Joseph Lee Burrow (born December 10, 1996) is an American professional football quarterback for the Cincinnati Bengals of the National Football League (NFL). After three seasons of college football with the Ohio State Buckeyes, he played two seasons for the LSU Tigers, winning the Heisman Trophy and the College Football Playoff National Championship in 2019. He was selected by the Bengals first overall in the 2020 NFL draft.

Burrow had a breakout season in 2021 when he led the Bengals to their first playoff win since 1990, ending the longest active drought in the four major North American sports, and an appearance in Super Bowl LVI, and was awarded Comeback Player of the Year. In 2023, Burrow signed, at the time, the largest contract in NFL history in terms of annual salary and led the Bengals to their first consecutive division titles in franchise history. Despite Cincinnati missing the playoffs in 2024, Burrow led the league in passing yards and passing touchdowns and was awarded his second Comeback Player of the Year Award. Burrow has been nicknamed "Joe Cool" and "Joe Brrr" by sportswriters and other players for his calmness under pressure.

== Early life ==
Burrow was born in Ames, Iowa, on December 10, 1996, the son of Robin and Jim Burrow. Jim is a former football player and coach whose career lasted over 40 years. Burrow was born while his father was on the coaching staff at Iowa State University. According to a 2019 Sports Illustrated story, "The Burrow athletic lineage dates back nearly a century." In the 1940s, his paternal grandmother set a Mississippi state high school record with an 82-point game in basketball. His paternal grandfather played basketball at Mississippi State; his uncle, John Burrow, played football at Ole Miss (the University of Mississippi); and two older brothers also played football at Nebraska.

He attended the 2002 Rose Bowl at age five, because his father was an assistant coach for the University of Nebraska in Lincoln. Not long after, he began playing in youth football leagues. Unlike his father, uncle, and brothers, who all played on defense, Burrow started out as a quarterback, because his first youth team had no one else who could play the position. The Burrow family moved to North Dakota in 2003 when his father was hired as the defensive coordinator at North Dakota State University in Fargo. One day, while Jim was visiting his office, future Central Michigan head coach Dan Enos commented that the seven-year-old Joe had a future in football. The Burrows spent two years in Fargo before Jim accepted the defensive coordinator position at Ohio University in Athens.

Burrow attended Athens High School (2011–2014) in The Plains, Ohio, leading the school to three straight playoff appearances and the school's first seven playoff victories in school history. During his career, he passed for 11,416 yards with 157 passing touchdowns and rushed for 2,067 yards with 27 rushing touchdowns. He was awarded the state's Mr. Football Award and Gatorade Player of the Year award as a senior in 2014. He and his Bulldog teammates went 14–1 that season. He was also a standout basketball player, and was named first-team all-state at point guard his senior year. Burrow was rated as a four-star football recruit, and was the eighth-highest ranked dual-threat quarterback in the class of 2015, according to the 247Sports Composite. He committed to Ohio State to play football on May 27, 2014.

In December 2019, the Athens City School District school board unanimously approved a measure to rename the school's football stadium in honor of Burrow. Burrow's connection with the area remains strong as such that during the 2020 NFL draft, he wore a T-shirt with the number 740 in reference to the area code for Athens as well as Appalachian Ohio in general.

== College career ==
=== Ohio State ===
After redshirting his first year at Ohio State in 2015, Burrow spent the next two years as a backup to J. T. Barrett, during which he played in 10 games, completing 29 of 39 passes for 287 yards and two touchdowns. In 2016, Burrow and Dwayne Haskins were backups for Barrett in that season's CFP Semifinal at the Fiesta Bowl against Clemson.

During Ohio State's spring game in 2018, Burrow completed 15 of 22 pass attempts for 238 yards and two touchdowns. The game was further part of Ohio State's competition for the starting quarterback position, contested by Burrow, Tate Martell, and Dwayne Haskins. Following the game, Burrow told reporters "I didn't come here to sit on the bench for four years. I know I'm a pretty good quarterback. I want to play somewhere." Realizing that Haskins would be named starting quarterback at Ohio State, Burrow transferred to Louisiana State University (LSU) on May 18, 2018. Burrow had graduated from Ohio State in three years with a degree in consumer and family financial services, and was immediately eligible as a graduate transfer.

=== LSU ===
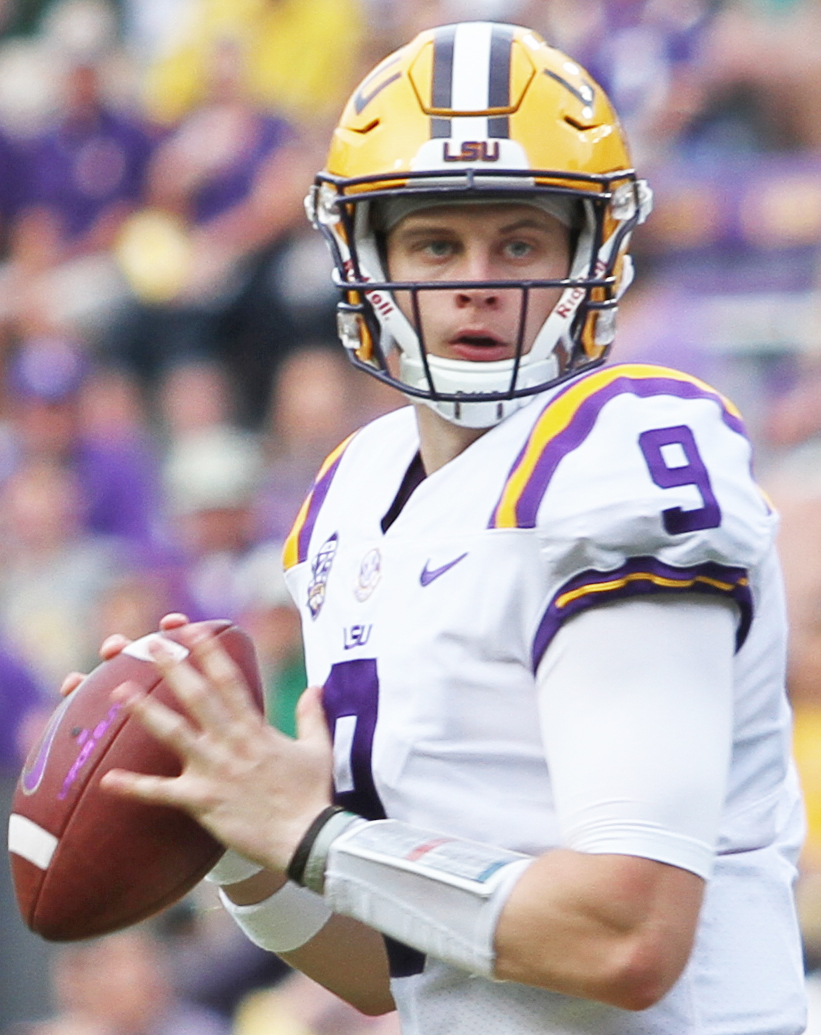
Burrow with LSU in 2018

==== 2018 ====
In his first year at LSU, Burrow was named the starting quarterback as a redshirt junior in 2018. In an early season road trip to then-No. 7 Auburn, Burrow threw for 249 yards and a touchdown en route to a 22–21 win. He was named the Southeastern Conference (SEC) Offensive Player of the Week following the victory. He again earned SEC Offensive Player of the Week honors following a 292-yard, three-touchdown performance against Ole Miss two weeks later. Burrow played in LSU's 7-overtime and 5-hour long loss to Texas A&M. After the game, Burrow experienced fatigue and had to receive IV therapy from trainers. Burrow helped lead the Tigers to a 10–3 record, including a win over UCF in the Fiesta Bowl, and a No. 6 ranking in the final AP Poll. Burrow finished the season with 2,894 yards passing, 16 touchdowns, and five interceptions. He added 399 rushing yards and seven rushing touchdowns.

==== 2019 ====
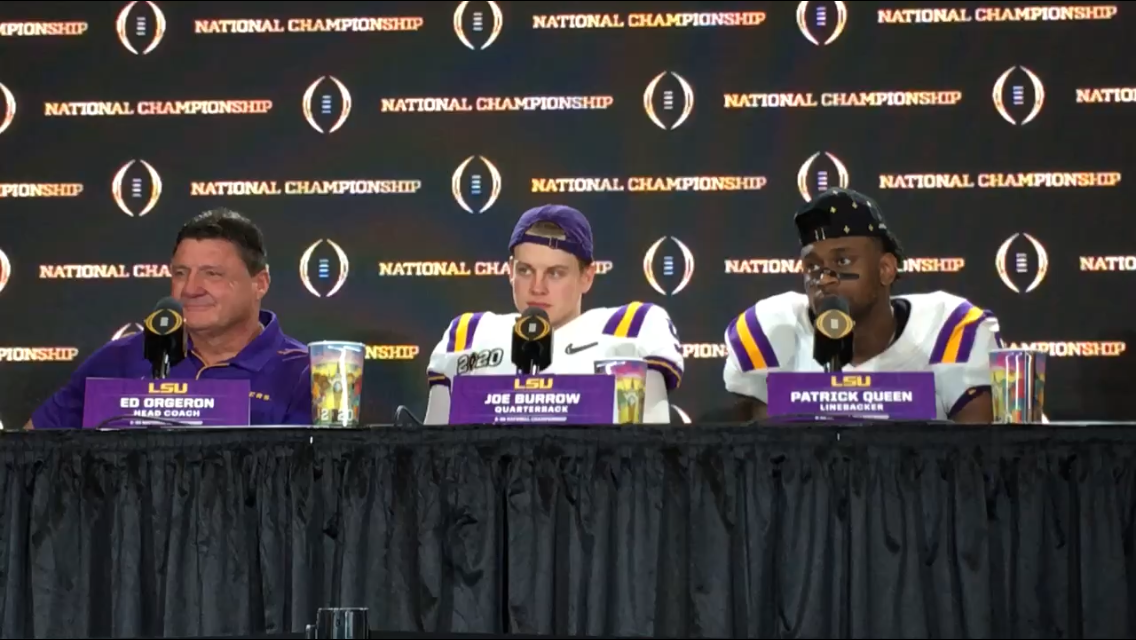
Burrow (center) with LSU head coach Ed Orgeron (left) and linebacker Patrick Queen (right) at LSU's 2020 National Championship post-game press event

Burrow was again named LSU's starting quarterback heading into his redshirt senior season in 2019. In the Tigers' season opener against Georgia Southern, Burrow threw for 278 yards and five touchdowns in a 55–3 win, and was later named SEC Co-Offensive Player of the Week (with Tua Tagovailoa). In a Week 2 road trip to ninth-ranked Texas, Burrow threw for 471 yards, four touchdowns, and an interception in a 45–38 win. His 471 yards were the second-most in school history and the most since Rohan Davey's 528 against Alabama in 2001. He was named Walter Camp National Offensive Player of the Week and SEC Offensive Player of the Week following the performance. Burrow earned his third SEC Offensive Player of the Week honors on September 21 during LSU's game against Vanderbilt. He threw for 398 yards and a school-record six passing touchdowns in the Tigers' 66–38 win. He became the first LSU quarterback to throw for over 350 yards in three consecutive games.

In a 42–6 win over Utah State, Burrow threw for 344 yards and five touchdowns, and became the first Tiger quarterback to throw for 300-plus yards in four consecutive games. The streak came to an end the next week against seventh-ranked Florida, but Burrow's 293 yards and three touchdown passes helped lead the Tigers to another win, 42–28. The next week, in LSU's seventh game of the season, Burrow eclipsed the LSU single-season passing touchdowns record of 28 when he added four more in a win against Mississippi State. In their next game, Burrow led LSU against ninth-ranked Auburn and LSU defeated another top 10 opponent, as Burrow's 321-yard, two-total-touchdowns performance set a new school record of eight career 300-yard games.

When LSU played Alabama on November 9, the two schools were ranked higher than they had been since they had played in the 2012 BCS National Championship Game; LSU was ranked second and Alabama third when the season's inaugural College Football Playoff rankings had been released the prior week. The game also featured two leading candidates for the Heisman Trophy in Burrow and Alabama quarterback Tua Tagovailoa. Burrow and the Tigers came away victorious in a 46–41 shootout. Burrow passed for 393 yards and three touchdowns in the game, and was again named Walter Camp National Offensive Player of the Week and SEC Co-Offensive Player of the Week, sharing the latter with teammate Clyde Edwards-Helaire.

The following week against Ole Miss, Burrow threw for 489 yards and five touchdown passes, and his single-season passing yards surpassed the LSU record set by Rohan Davey in 2001. Burrow also set an LSU record for consecutive completed passes with 17 during the game. On November 30, Burrow and LSU secured an undefeated regular season with a 50–7 win over Texas A&M, in which Burrow threw for 352 yards and three touchdowns. During the game, he broke the SEC record for single-season passing yards – previously set by Kentucky's Tim Couch – and tied the conference record for single-season touchdowns (which had been set by Missouri's Drew Lock). Burrow took sole possession of the SEC single-season touchdown record the following week in the SEC Championship Game, throwing for four touchdowns in LSU's 37–10 win over Georgia that secured the Tigers' place in the College Football Playoff.

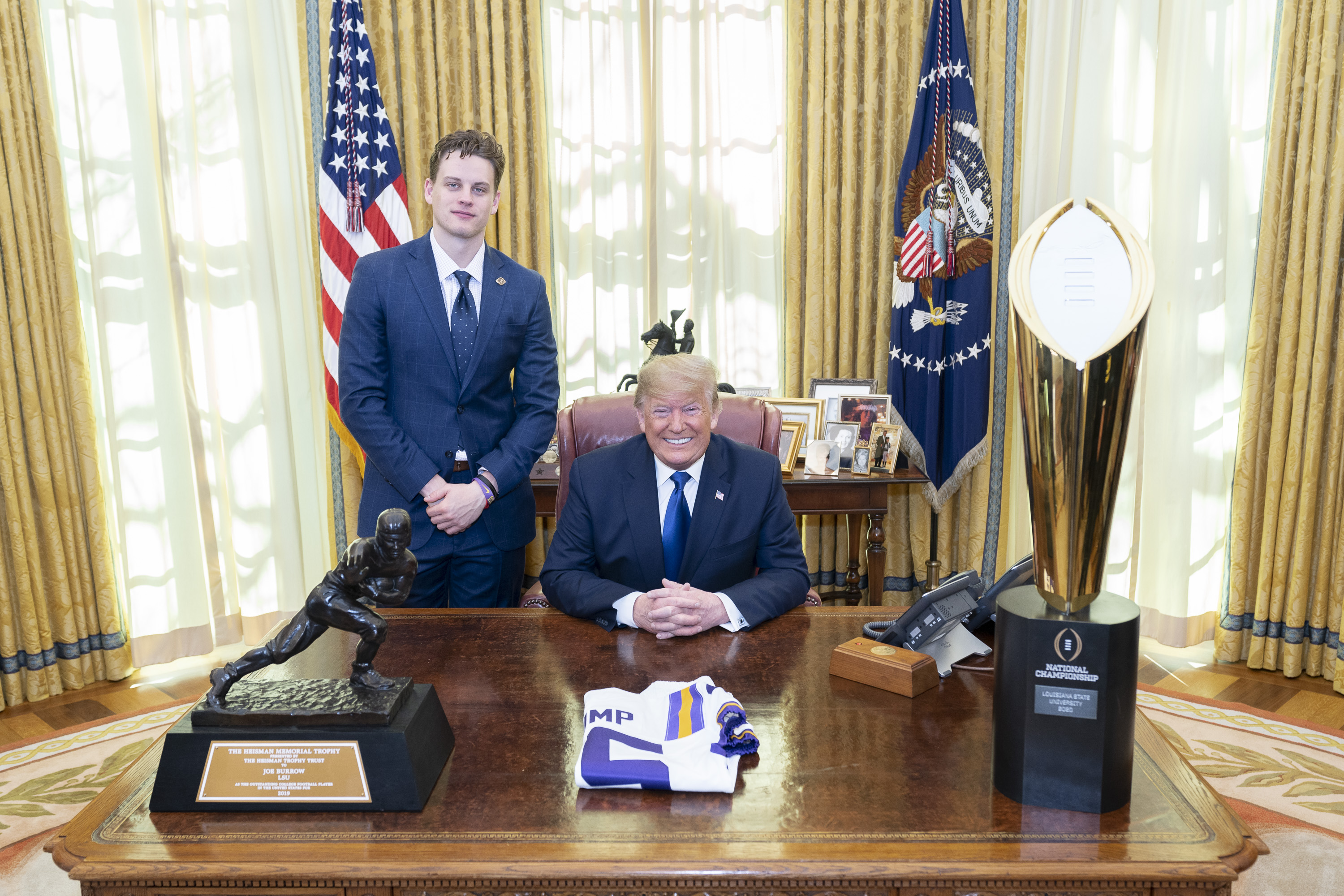
Burrow with President Donald Trump at the White House in 2020 after winning the Heisman Trophy and the college football national championship

On December 14, 2019, Burrow was awarded the 2019 Heisman Trophy, receiving 1,846 more votes than runner-up Jalen Hurts. It was the largest victory margin in the history of the award, with Burrow receiving the highest-ever share of available points. Burrow's Heisman acceptance speech referred to the rampant poverty and food insecurity affecting his hometown; shortly after his speech, the Athens County food bank was the recipient of $450,000 in donations. Burrow received many other awards during college football award season, including SEC Offensive Player of the Year, AP Player of the Year, Maxwell Award, Walter Camp Award, Johnny Unitas Golden Arm Award, Davey O'Brien Award, Lombardi Award, and Manning Award. He was named as a Unanimous All-American.

In LSU's College Football Playoff semifinal game against fourth-ranked Oklahoma in the 2019 Peach Bowl, Burrow threw for seven touchdowns during the first half of the contest and had a total of 493 passing yards – along with scoring a rushing touchdown – in a 63–28 victory for the Tigers. Burrow's eight total touchdowns were all scored within the first 35 minutes of the 60-minute game, after which he was taken out for the sake of giving him rest. Analysts have called the performance one of the greatest in college football history.

In the 2020 National Championship Game against Clemson, Burrow threw for 463 yards with six total touchdowns, five of which were passing, which led LSU to a 42–25 victory and him being named the game's offensive MVP. He finished his 2019 season with 60 passing touchdowns, which broke the single-season FBS record previously set by Colt Brennan's 58 in 2006. (Note: This record has since fallen to Bailey Zappe of Western Kentucky, who threw for 62 touchdowns in 2021.) Burrow also set a FBS single-season record with 65 total touchdowns (tied by Bailey Zappe in 2021). His 5,671 passing yards is now tied (with Case Keenum in 2009) for fourth-most in an FBS season. His passer rating of 202 for the season was a record at the time. Several sportswriters deemed the season to be the greatest ever by a college quarterback.

== Professional career ==
Pre-draft measurables
Height	Weight	Arm length	Hand span	Wingspan	Wonderlic
6 ft 3 1/2 in (1.92 m)	221 lb (100 kg)	30 7/8 in (0.78 m)	9 in (0.23 m)	6 ft 2 in (1.88 m)	34
All values from NFL Combine

=== 2020 ===
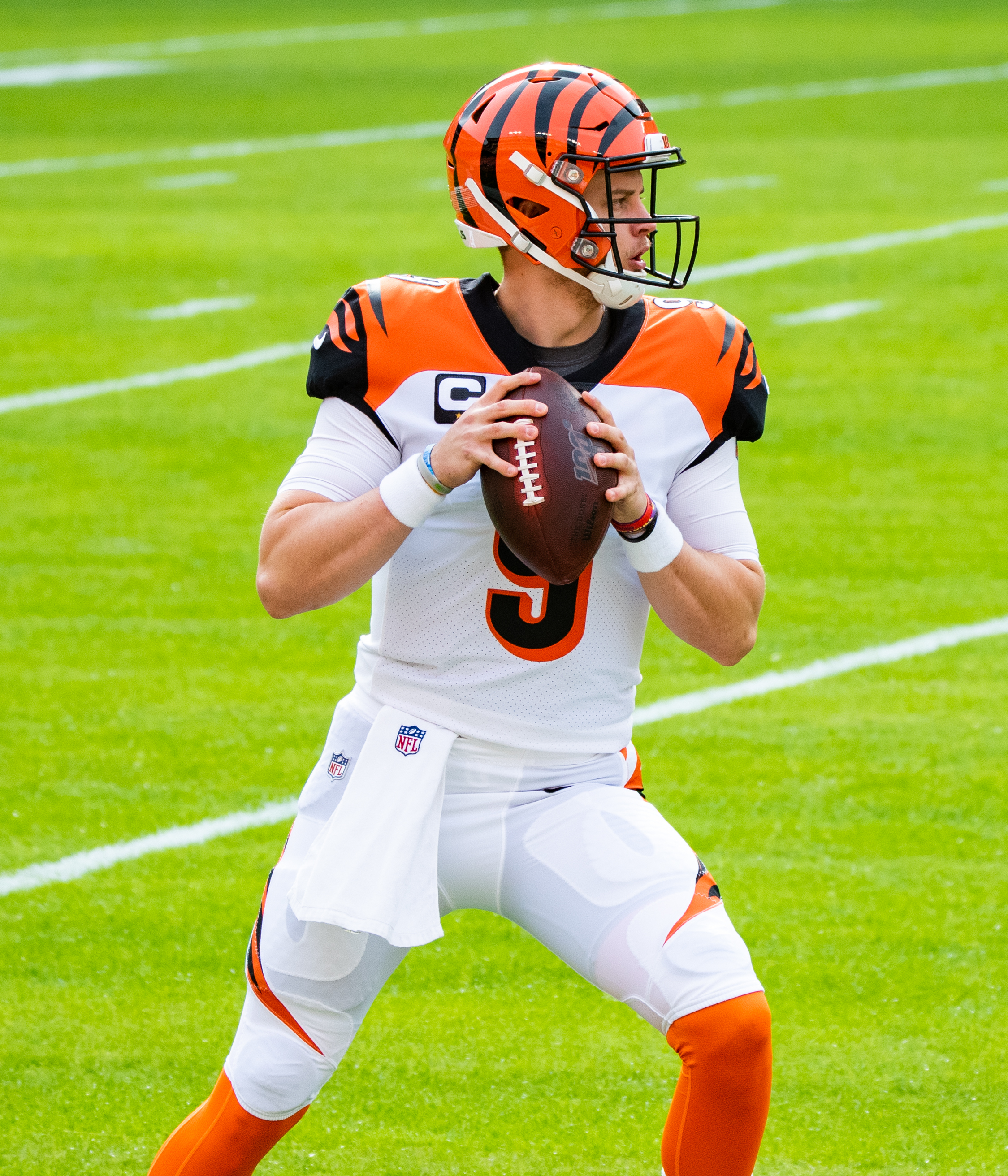
Burrow as a rookie with the Cincinnati Bengals, 2020

Burrow was one of 58 players invited to the 2020 NFL draft, where he was selected first overall by the Cincinnati Bengals. He was the third-consecutive Heisman-winning quarterback to be selected first overall, following Baker Mayfield and Kyler Murray. Burrow signed his four-year rookie contract, worth $36.1 million, on July 31, 2020.

Burrow was the only rookie quarterback from his draft class to start on opening week. In his debut, Burrow threw for 193 passing yards and an interception, while adding 46 rushing yards and a rushing touchdown in a 16–13 loss against the Los Angeles Chargers. During the next game against the Cleveland Browns, Burrow threw his first career passing touchdown, a 23-yard pass to tight end C. J. Uzomah. Although the Bengals lost the game, 35–30, he attempted 61 passes, completing 37 of them for 316 yards and three touchdowns, which broke the NFL record for most completions by a rookie quarterback in a single game. Two weeks later, Burrow earned his first career win by defeating the Jacksonville Jaguars. He also became the first rookie quarterback to throw for 300 or more yards in three straight games.

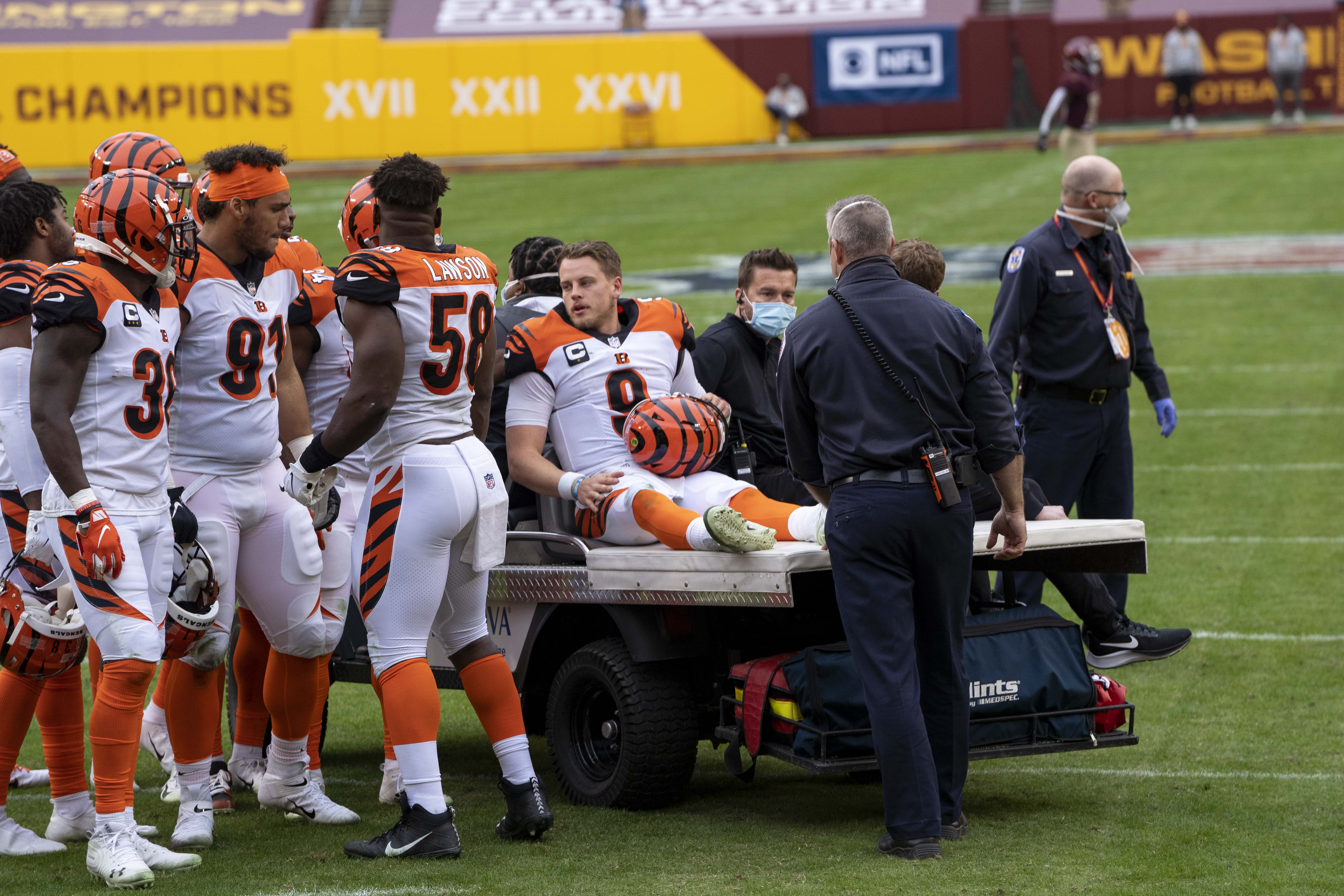
Burrow being carted off after a knee injury in 2020

In a Week 7 game against the Browns, Burrow had 406 passing yards, three passing touchdowns, one rushing touchdown, and one interception in a 37–34 loss. He became the first rookie in NFL history with at least 400 passing yards, three passing touchdowns, and a rushing touchdown in a single game, and had completed more passes (221) than any other player in NFL history during their first eight games.

In the second half of a Week 11 game against the Washington Football Team, Burrow was hit low while throwing a pass and subsequently tore his ACL and MCL in his left knee, among other damage to his PCL and meniscus. He was later placed on injured reserve, ending his rookie season. Undergoing knee surgery in December, Burrow continued to review game film despite being out for the season.

Burrow finished his rookie outing with 264 completions against 404 attempts for 2,688 yards, 13 touchdowns and five interceptions. His interception percentage of 1.2% is the fourth lowest for a rookie in NFL history (only behind Dak Prescott, C. J. Stroud and Caleb Williams) and the best ever for a rookie quarterback for the Bengals in franchise history. Despite his strong numbers, Burrow was only able to record a record of 2-7-1 as a rookie with the Bengals finishing their 2020 campaign with a season record of 4-11 and placing fourth in the AFC North, missing the playoffs.

=== 2021 ===
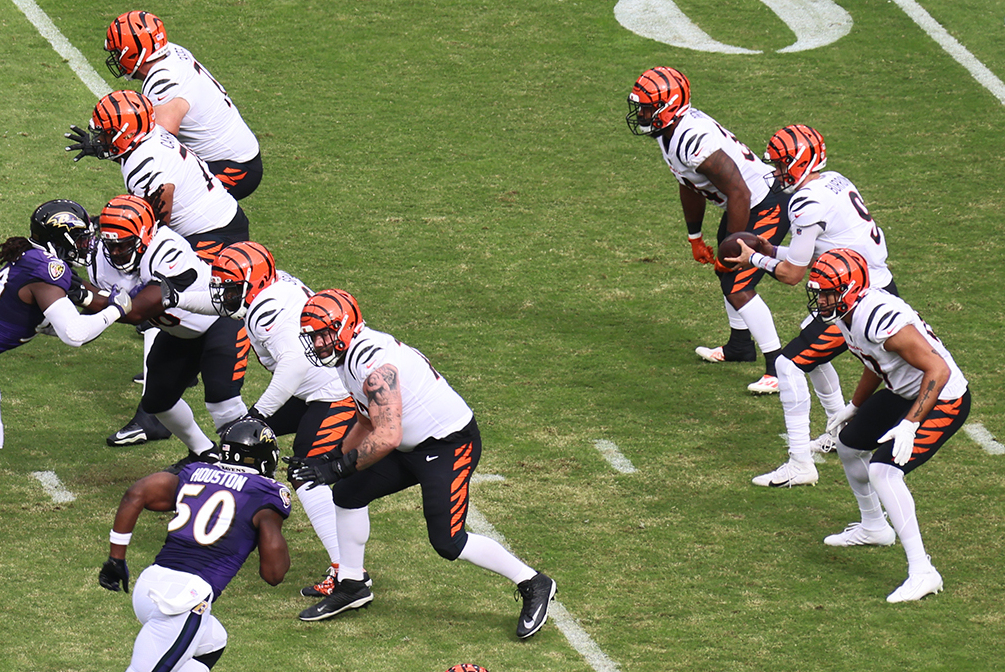
Burrow playing against the Baltimore Ravens at M&T Bank Stadium in Baltimore in October 2021

On September 6, the Bengals confirmed Burrow had completed his rehab and would be the starter for Week 1. Burrow returned from his injury and helped lead the Bengals to a 2–1 start. In Week 4, Burrow completed 25 of 32 passes for 348 yards and two touchdowns in a 24–21 win over the Jaguars, earning AFC Offensive Player of the Week.

Against the Baltimore Ravens in Week 16, Burrow completed 37 of 46 passes, threw for a career-high 525 yards, while also throwing four touchdowns without an interception, for a career-high 143.2 passer rating in the 41–21 win. Burrow's 525 yards were the fourth most passing yards in a game in NFL history, and broke Boomer Esiason's franchise record for most passing yards in a game as a result. The victory in this game was Cincinnati's ninth of the year, clinching the first winning record for the team since the 2015 season, and put the Bengals in first place of the AFC North. Burrow was named AFC Offensive Player of the Week as a result of his performance.

The next week against the Kansas City Chiefs, Burrow threw for 446 yards, four touchdowns, and no interceptions in the 34–31 win. The win helped the Bengals clinch the AFC North and a playoff berth for the first time since 2015. Burrow finished the season playing in 16 games with 4,611 passing yards and 34 passing touchdowns, both franchise records. He also led the league in completion percentage (70.4%) and yards per pass attempt (8.9), but also led the league in sacks taken. He was named Comeback Player of the Year by the Associated Press and the PFWA.

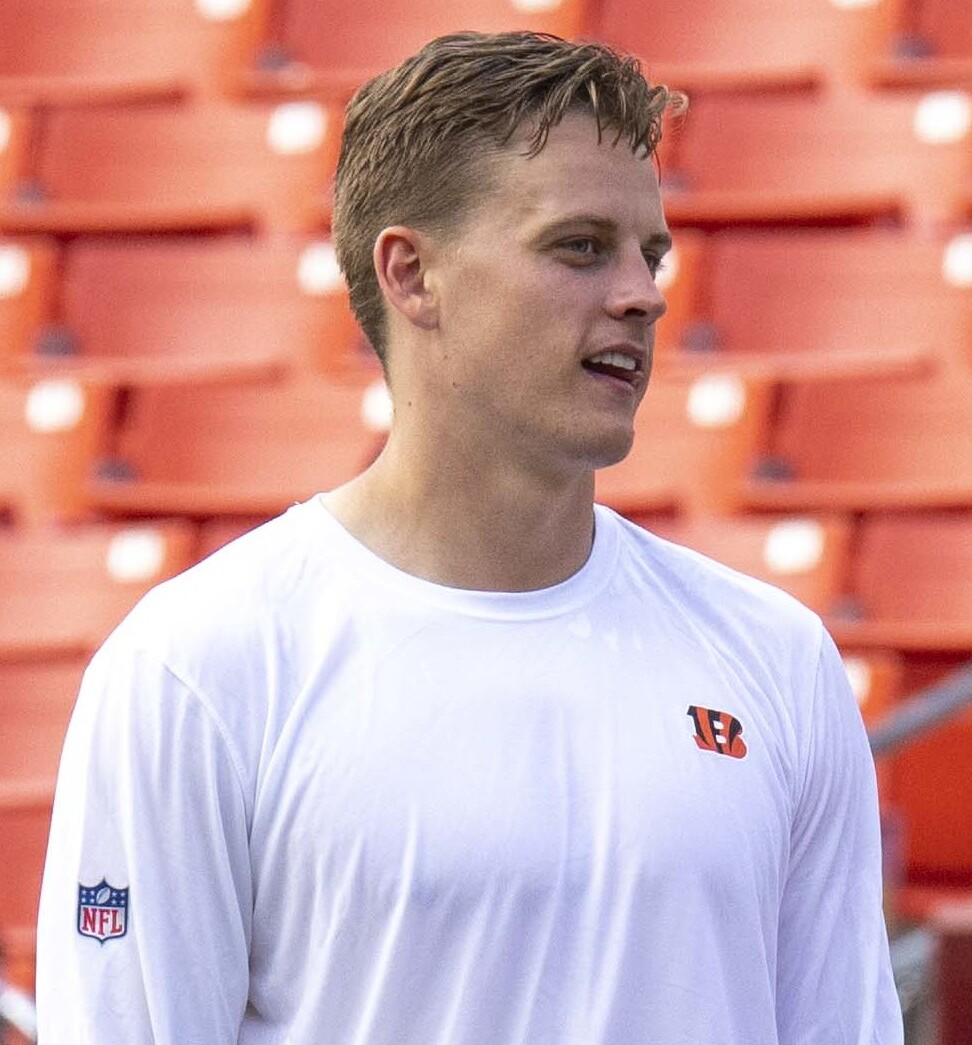
Burrow in 2021

In his playoff debut, Burrow threw for 244 yards and two touchdowns in the 26–19 win against the Las Vegas Raiders in the Wild Card Round, ending the Bengals' playoff win drought that had been active since the 1990 season. During the Divisional Round against the top-seeded Tennessee Titans, Burrow threw for 348 yards and an interception in the 19–16 win, which was the first time in franchise history the Bengals won a playoff game on the road. The victory occurred despite Burrow being sacked nine times, tying Warren Moon in 1993 for the most times sacked in a playoff game and becoming the most-sacked quarterback to win a playoff game. In the AFC Championship Game against the Chiefs, Burrow threw for 250 yards, two touchdowns, an interception, and helped the Bengals overcome a 21–3 deficit to win 27–24 in overtime. The 18-point comeback was tied with the Indianapolis Colts in 2006 for the largest in a conference championship. With the victory, the Bengals reached Super Bowl LVI, their first appearance since Super Bowl XXIII in 1988.

In the Super Bowl, Burrow threw for 263 yards and a touchdown, but was sacked 7 times, ultimately losing to the Los Angeles Rams 23–20. Burrow set a playoff record for most times sacked in a single postseason, being sacked 19 times, surpassing the previous record set by Wade Wilson in 1987, with 14. He was ranked 21st by his fellow players on the NFL Top 100 Players of 2022.

=== 2022 ===
Burrow underwent emergency surgery to remove his appendix on July 26, 2022, as a result of severe appendicitis. In Week 1 against the Pittsburgh Steelers, Burrow committed a career-high five turnovers, which included losing a fumble and throwing four interceptions, along with being sacked seven times in the 23–20 overtime loss. Burrow returned to the state of Louisiana in Week 6 against the New Orleans Saints, returning to the Caesars Superdome for the first time since winning the College National Championship. Burrow threw for 300 yards and three touchdowns in the 30–26 victory, two of which to former college teammate Ja'Marr Chase. The following week against the Atlanta Falcons, Burrow finished the game throwing for 481 yards in the 35–17 win. The game was Burrow's fifth game with over 400 passing yards, setting an NFL record for the most 400-yard games in a player's first three seasons. It was also his second game with over 500 yards of offense and four touchdowns, making him the first player to accomplish this multiple times. Burrow was named AFC Offensive Player of the Week as a result of his performance.

In Week 13, Burrow threw for 286 yards and two touchdowns, along with 46 rushing yards and a touchdown in a 27–24 win over the Chiefs, earning AFC Offensive Player of the Week. On December 21, Burrow was selected to the Pro Bowl for the first time in his career. In their Week 15 matchup against the Tampa Bay Buccaneers, the Bengals found themselves down 17–3 at halftime. Burrow orchestrated a remarkable comeback in the second half, leading the team to 31 unanswered points and throwing four touchdown passes to four different receivers to lead the team to a 34–23 win. The next week, Burrow threw for 375 yards and three touchdowns in a 22–18 win over the New England Patriots, earning his third AFC Offensive Player of the Week honor of the season.

The Bengals' Week 17 game against the Buffalo Bills was declared a no contest due to Bills' safety Damar Hamlin suffering cardiac arrest in-game. This resulted in the Bengals being declared AFC North champions ahead of their final week match against Baltimore, marking the first time the franchise won consecutive division titles. He finished the season ranked fifth in the NFL in both completions (414) and passing yards (4,475), while his franchise record 35 touchdown passes ranked in 2nd. Meanwhile, the Bengals finished 12–4 on the season, their best record since 2015, and won their last eight games consecutively.

In the 2022–23 NFL playoffs, Burrow led the Bengals to a narrow win over the Ravens in the Wild Card Round and a decisive victory over the Bills in the Divisional Round en route to their second consecutive AFC Championship appearance. In a rematch of the previous AFC Championship Game, the Bengals lost to the eventual Super Bowl champion Chiefs 23–20. He was ranked 6th by his fellow players on the NFL Top 100 Players of 2023, his first ever appearance in the top ten on the list.

=== 2023 ===
Ahead of the season, Burrow suffered a right calf strain during training camp. Bengals head coach Zac Taylor initially stated that Burrow was to be sidelined for "several weeks", with no clear timeline in place for his return, but later made a bold announcement that he was "better than he's ever looked," implying a more positive than expected recovery. On September 7, 2023, Burrow signed a five-year, $275 million contract extension, surpassing Justin Herbert to become the highest-paid player in NFL history on an annual basis, with an average annual salary of $55 million.

In Week 8, Burrow threw for 283 yards and three touchdowns while completing 87.5% of passes in a 31–17 win over the 49ers, earning AFC Offensive Player of the Week honors. During the first half of the game, Burrow reset his career high with 19 consecutive completed passes.

On November 16, Burrow suffered a torn Scapholunate ligament in his right wrist in the first half of the Bengals' Week 11 game against the Ravens. The next day, the Bengals announced that Burrow was to miss the remainder of the season. Burrow was placed on the injured reserve on November 25, and soon thereafter underwent surgery. On November 17, the NFL launched an investigation into whether the Bengals were compliant with the injury report policy as the team posted and then deleted a video on X, which featured Burrow wearing what appeared to be a soft cast on his right hand prior to the game. The league finished its investigation a few weeks later, concluding that the Bengals were compliant with the policy.

Burrow continued to be involved with team activities and supported his teammates, particularly backup quarterback Jake Browning, from the sidelines for all remaining games of the 2023 season. He was ranked 39th by his fellow players on the NFL Top 100 Players of 2024.

=== 2024 ===
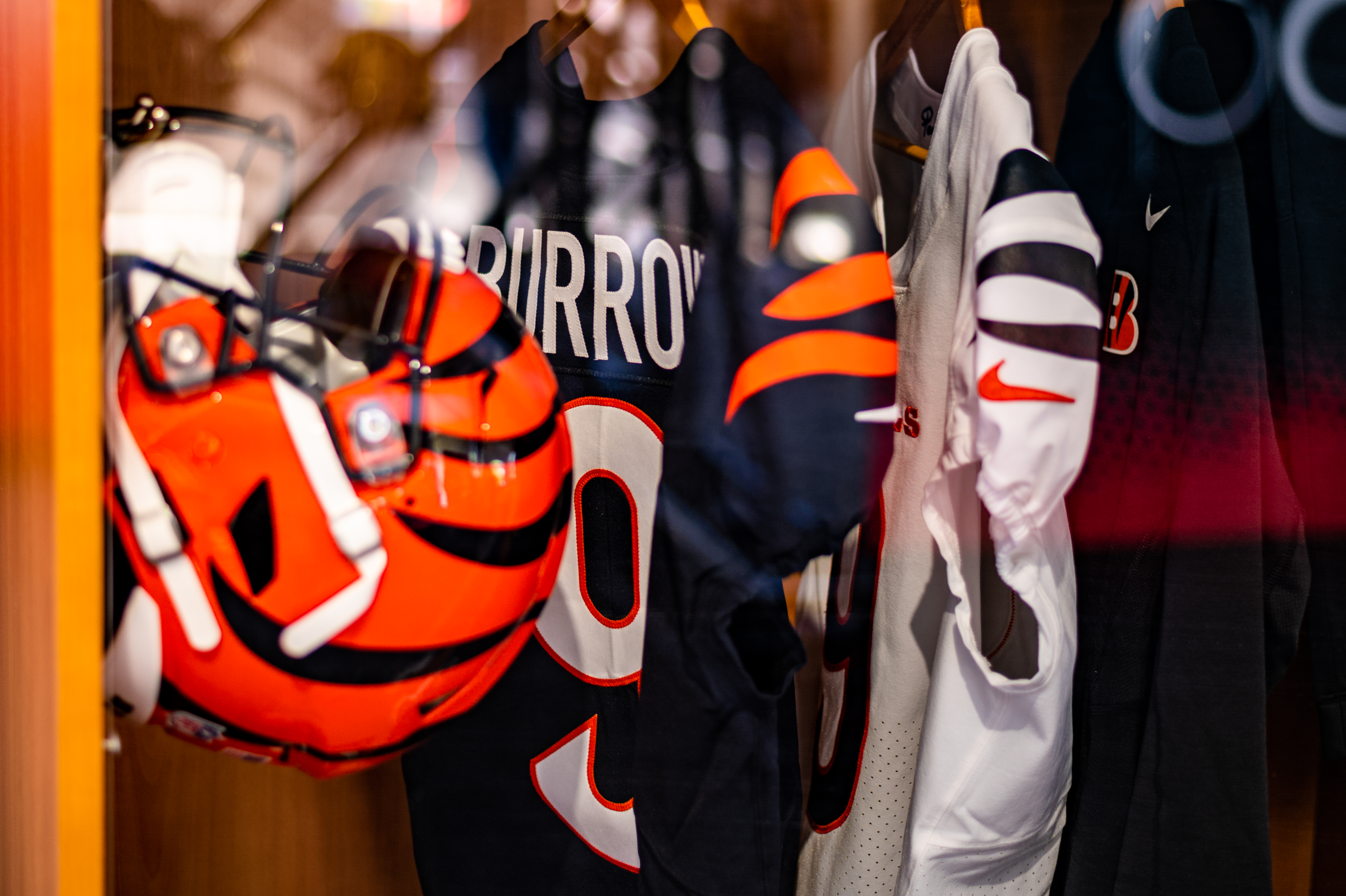
Burrow's locker at Paycor Stadium

Burrow fully recovered from his wrist surgery in time for the 2024 season. He and the Bengals opened the season 0–2 for the third consecutive season following losses to the Patriots and Chiefs. They dropped to 0–3 following a loss to the Washington Commanders, despite 324 yards, three passing touchdowns, and zero turnovers from Burrow. Before their Week 4 matchup against the Carolina Panthers, Burrow delivered an uncharacteristic pregame speech. The speech resonated with the team as the Bengals won their first game of the season, with Burrow passing for 232 yards and two touchdowns, both of which came in the first half.

In Week 5, Burrow threw for 353 yards and a career-high five touchdown passes in a 41–38 overtime loss to the Baltimore Ravens. Sitting at 1–4, Burrow led victories over the New York Giants and Cleveland Browns, including a career-long 47-yard touchdown run against the Giants and two second half touchdowns against the Browns. In Week 9, Burrow threw for 251 yards, a career-high-tying five touchdown passes and one interception in a 41–24 win over the Las Vegas Raiders. After beating the Raiders, Burrow threw for 428 yards and four touchdowns against the Ravens, followed by a 356-yard, three-touchdown performance against the Chargers. Despite his efforts, the Bengals lost both games, making Burrow the first player to throw for over 300 yards with at least three touchdowns and no interceptions in consecutive games and lose both in regulation. He was named AFC Offensive Player of the Month for November.

Against the Steelers in Week 13, Burrow had another prolific passing day, finishing with 309 yards and three touchdowns, but he also committed three turnovers as the Bengals lost 44–38 and dropped to 4–8 on the season. With their playoff hopes dwindling, Burrow led the Bengals on a four-game winning streak to reach 8–8 heading into the final week. During the streak, Burrow completed over 75% of his passes for 1,304 yards, 12 touchdowns, and three interceptions for a 116 passer rating, highlighted by a 412-yard, four-touchdown performance against the Denver Broncos in an elimination scenario. The performance also marked Burrow's eighth consecutive outing with at least 250 passing yards and three touchdowns, the longest streak in NFL history. He was named AFC Offensive Player of the Week for Week 17. He was named AFC Offensive Player of the Month for December. Burrow led the Bengals to victory in Week 18 against the Steelers to cap the season off on a five-game winning streak, but a win from the Broncos the following day eliminated them from playoff contention. He earned his second Pro Bowl nomination.

Returning from wrist surgery, Burrow finished the 2024 season with a career-best 4,918 passing yards and 43 touchdowns, leading the NFL in both statistics. He became the third quarterback to have at least 4,500 passing yards, 40 passing touchdowns, and fewer than 10 interceptions, joining Tom Brady in 2007 and Aaron Rodgers in 2011. Burrow won the Comeback Player of the Year Award, joining Chad Pennington as the only player to win the award twice. He was ranked sixth by his fellow players on the NFL Top 100 Players of 2025.

=== 2025 ===
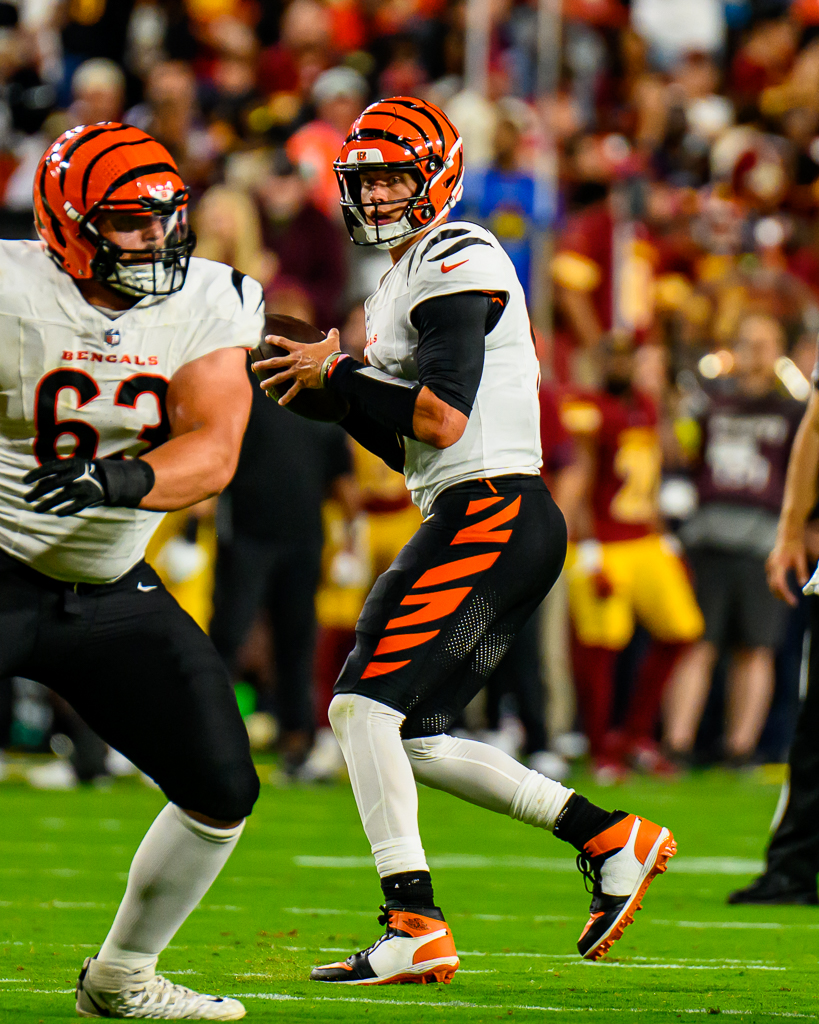
Burrow playing against the Washington Commanders in the 2025 preseason

During the Bengals season opener against division rival Cleveland Browns, Burrow would throw for 113 yards and a single touchdown to newly acquired tight end Noah Fant from Seattle. In the Bengals week two game against the Jacksonville Jaguars, Burrow would take a sack during the second quarter of the game. After medical examination, he was ruled out for the remainder of the game with a left toe injury. He finished the game with 76 yards and 1 touchdown before backup quarterback Jake Browning took his place. Later that day, it was reported that Burrow suffered a metatarsophalangeal joint sprain known as turf toe as well as "significant ligament damage". The next day, it was announced that his injury would require surgery, and his estimated recovery time was set at a minimum of 3 months. He was officially put on injured reserve on September 16. Burrow was activated on November 26, ahead of Cincinnati's Thanksgiving matchup against the Baltimore Ravens. Burrow led the team to a 32–14 victory with two touchdown passes in his return. In Week 16, Burrow completed 25 of 32 passes for 309 yards and four touchdowns in a 45–21 win over the Miami Dolphins, earning AFC Offensive Player of the Week honors. Burrow played in eight games in the 2025 season. He finished with 1,809 yards, 17 touchdowns, and five interceptions. He earned Pro Bowl honors for the third time. He was ranked 44th by his fellow players on the NFL Top 100 Players of 2026.

=== 2026 ===
Burrow led the Bengals to a 33−27 victory over the Tampa Bay Buccaneers to begin the season. In Week 7 of the 2026 season against the Baltimore Ravens, Burrow completed 73.3% of his passes (22-of-30), for 292 yards and four touchdowns in the 35-13 victory and was named AFC Offensive Player of the Week. In Week 10, Burrow led the Bengals to a 38-18 victory against the Pittsburgh Steelers and completed 35 of 44 passes for a 79.5 completion percentage, four touchdowns, 409 yards, no interceptions and a 135.7 passer rating, earning him his second AFC Offensive Player of the Week of the season.

== Career statistics ==
Legend
	NFL record
	Led the league
**Bold**	Career high

=== NFL ===
==== Regular season ====
Year	Team	Games			Passing									Rushing					Sacked		Fumbles	
Year	Team	GP	GS	Record	Cmp	Att	Pct	Yds	Y/A	Lng	TD	Int	Rtg	Att	Yds	Y/A	Lng	TD	Sck	SckY	Fum	Lost
2020	CIN	10	10	2−7−1	264	404	65.3	2,688	6.7	67	13	5	89.8	37	142	3.8	23	3	32	231	9	4
2021	CIN	16	16	10−6	366	520	70.4	4,611	**8.9**	**82**	34	**14**	108.3	40	118	3.0	12	2	**51**	**370**	5	2
2022	CIN	16	16	**12−4**	414	606	68.3	4,475	7.4	60	35	12	100.8	**75**	**257**	3.4	23	**5**	41	259	6	3
2023	CIN	10	10	5−5	244	365	66.8	2,309	6.3	64	15	6	91.0	31	88	2.8	20	0	24	180	2	1
2024	CIN	17	17	9–8	**460**	**652**	70.6	**4,918**	7.5	70	**43**	9	108.5	42	201	**4.8**	**47**	2	48	278	**11**	**5**
2025	CIN	8	8	5–3	173	259	66.8	1,809	7.0	43	17	5	100.7	14	41	2.9	9	0	17	113	0	0
2026	CIN	9	9	7–2	254	340	**74.7**	2,795	8.2	53	27	6	**117.7**	24	85	3.5	12	3	16	105	2	1
Career		86	86	50–35–1	2,175	3,146	69.1	23,605	7.5	82	184	57	102.9	263	932	3.5	47	15	229	1,536	35	16

==== Postseason ====
Year	Team	Games			Passing									Rushing					Sacked		Fumbles	
Year	Team	GP	GS	Record	Cmp	Att	Pct	Yds	Y/A	Lng	TD	Int	Rtg	Att	Yds	Y/A	Lng	TD	Sck	SckY	Fum	Lost
2021	CIN	4	4	**3−1**	**97**	**142**	**68.3**	**1,105**	**7.8**	**75**	**5**	2	**97.3**	11	31	2.8	11	0	**19**	**137**	0	0
2022	CIN	3	3	2–1	72	109	66.1	721	6.6	35	4	2	89.3	**15**	**70**	**4.7**	**21**	**1**	10	60	0	0
Career		7	7	5−2	169	251	67.3	1,826	7.3	75	9	4	93.8	26	101	3.9	21	1	29	197	0	0

=== College ===
Legend
Heisman Trophy
CFP national champion
Led the NCAA

Season	Team	Games			Passing							Rushing			
Season	Team	GP	GS	Record	Cmp	Att	Pct	Yds	TD	Int	Rtg	Att	Yds	Avg	TD
2015	Ohio State	0	0	—	(redshirt) Redshirted										
2016	Ohio State	6	0	—	22	28	**78.6**	226	2	0	169.9	12	58	**4.8**	1
2017	Ohio State	5	0	—	7	11	63.6	61	0	0	110.2	3	−5	−1.7	0
2018	LSU	13	13	10–3	219	379	57.8	2,894	16	5	133.2	**128**	**399**	3.1	**7**
2019	LSU	15	15	**15–0**	**402**	**527**	76.3	**5,671**	**60**	**6**	**202.0**	115	368	3.2	5
Career		39	28	25–3	650	945	68.8	8,852	78	11	172.4	258	820	3.2	13

== Career highlights ==
=== Awards and honors ===
NFL

- AFC champion (2021)
- 2× NFL Comeback Player of the Year (2021, 2024)
- PFWA Comeback Player of the Year (2021)
- 3× Pro Bowl (2022, 2024, 2025)
- NFL passing yards leader (2024)
- NFL passing touchdowns leader (2024)
- NFL completion percentage leader (2021)
- 12× FedEx Air Player of the Week (2021: Week 4, Week 7, Week 16, Week 17), (2022: Week 6, Week 7, Week 11), (2023: Week 5), (2024: Week 5, Week 9), (2025: Week 16, Week 17)
- FedEx Air Player of the Year (2022)
- George Halas Award (2025)
- 5× NFL Top 100 — 21st (2022), 6th (2023), 39th (2024), 6th (2025), 44th (2026)

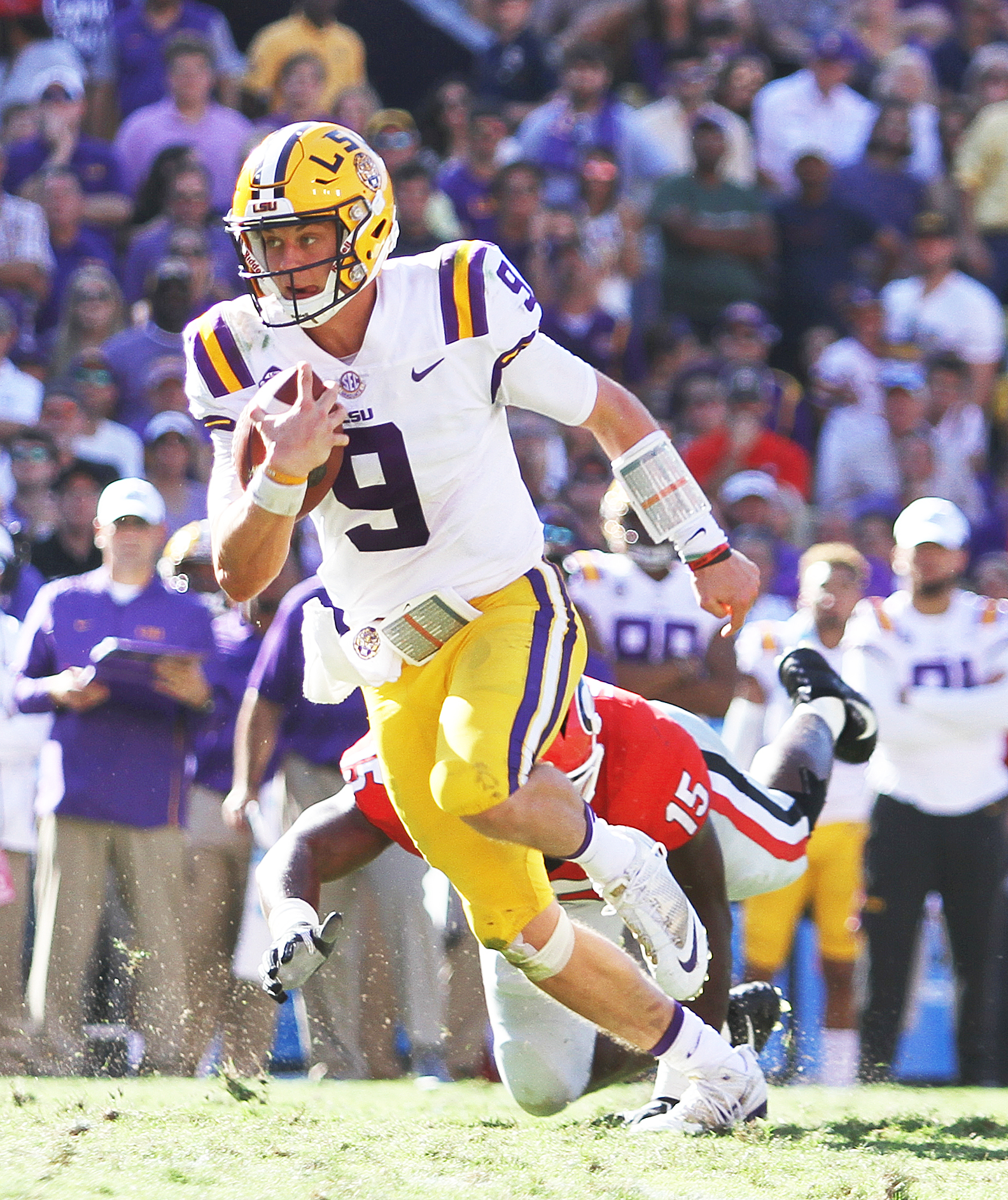
Burrow with LSU in 2018

College

- CFP national champion (2019)
- CFP National Championship Offensive MVP (2019)
- Heisman Trophy (2019)
- NCAA completion percentage leader (2019)
- NCAA passing yards leader (2019)
- NCAA passing touchdowns leader (2019)
- NCAA passer rating leader (2019)
- Maxwell Award (2019)
- Walter Camp Award (2019)
- Johnny Unitas Golden Arm Award (2019)
- Davey O'Brien Award (2019)
- Manning Award (2019)
- Lombardi Award (2019)
- AP College Football Player of the Year (2019)
- Sporting News College Football Player of the Year (2019)
- 2019 Peach Bowl Offensive MVP
- 2019 Fiesta Bowl Offensive MVP
- Unanimous All-American (2019)
- SEC Offensive Player of the Year (2019)
- First-team All-SEC (2019)

=== Records ===
==== NFL records ====
- Highest career completion percentage: 68.5%
- Most completions by a rookie, game: 37
- Most pass completions per game, career: 24.9
- Most consecutive 300+ yards passing games as rookie: 3

==== Bengals franchise records ====
- Most passing yards, game: 525
- Most passing yards, season: 4,918
- Most passing touchdowns, season: 43
- Highest passer rating, season: 108.5
- Highest completion percentage, career (min. 500 pass attempts): 68.5%
- Highest passer rating, career (min. 500 pass attempts): 100.4
- Most 400+ yard passing games, career: 5
- Most 300+ yard passing games, season: 6 (2021)

== Player profile ==
"Burrow is considered a relatively quiet, occasionally quirky guy. But he's beloved in the LSU locker room, largely because he plays with a competitiveness that borders on fanatical."

— Robert Mays of The Ringer in a profile about Burrow (November 2019).

At the NFL combine, Burrow was measured to be 6 ft 3 in and 221 lbs; his hands were measured to be 9 inches. In 2021, Sports Illustrated writer Mike Santagata wrote that Burrow is "bigger than he looks at about 230 pounds," while also noting his athleticism and strength.

Through his junior year at LSU, Burrow "initial run through the [NFL's] scouting machine resulted in such an underwhelming consensus". Many scouts viewed Burrow as an "NFL draft afterthought", and considered him "a late-round project and potential backup." He was seen as having limited physical traits and average production prior to his senior season. SEC analyst Jordan Rodgers opined that Burrow was "wildly inconsistent, and frankly very poor against good competition" in 2018. Burrow's 2019 season was cited as helping draw more attention to scouts to reconsider their evaluation of him, and his football IQ, accuracy, pocket mobility, and playmaking outside of the pocket have all been cited as strengths of his game. The Bengals caught attention of these traits in 2019, making Burrow the top pick in the 2020 NFL draft.

=== Football IQ ===
Burrow's football IQ has often been cited by writers, coaches, coordinators, and other players as a critical aspect of Burrow's game. He has been analyzed as being capable of processing opposing defenses quickly. Burrow participated in game plan meetings during his tenure at LSU to discuss the next opponent, where he pitched game plan ideas with LSU passing game coordinator Joe Brady and offensive coordinator Steve Ensminger. The two coaches also trusted Burrow with presnap play calls and Burrow was noted by Sports Illustrated for his tendency to "often change receiver routes based on defensive formations." College GameDay analyst Kirk Herbstreit likened Burrow to a "co-offensive coordinator", stating "That's the NFL model, when you have a quarterback able to invest and communicate at that level. [Burrow] is the cutting edge of that mold. When I watch LSU, it's not just Joe Brady's offense—it's Joe Brady and Joe Burrow's offense." As a Bengal, Burrow was noted to have successfully called his own plays during the 2021 Divisional Round game against Tennessee.

Burrow plays chess in his spare time, as well as during game preparation. He keeps a chessboard in his locker. Prior to Super Bowl LVI, Burrow played ten matches of online chess. Cornerback Chidobe Awuzie, who plays chess with Burrow and was teammates with him from 2021 through 2023, commented "The fact that he plays chess lets you know that he's able to prioritize certain things and articulate things very fast and have formation recognition."

=== Accuracy and physical traits ===
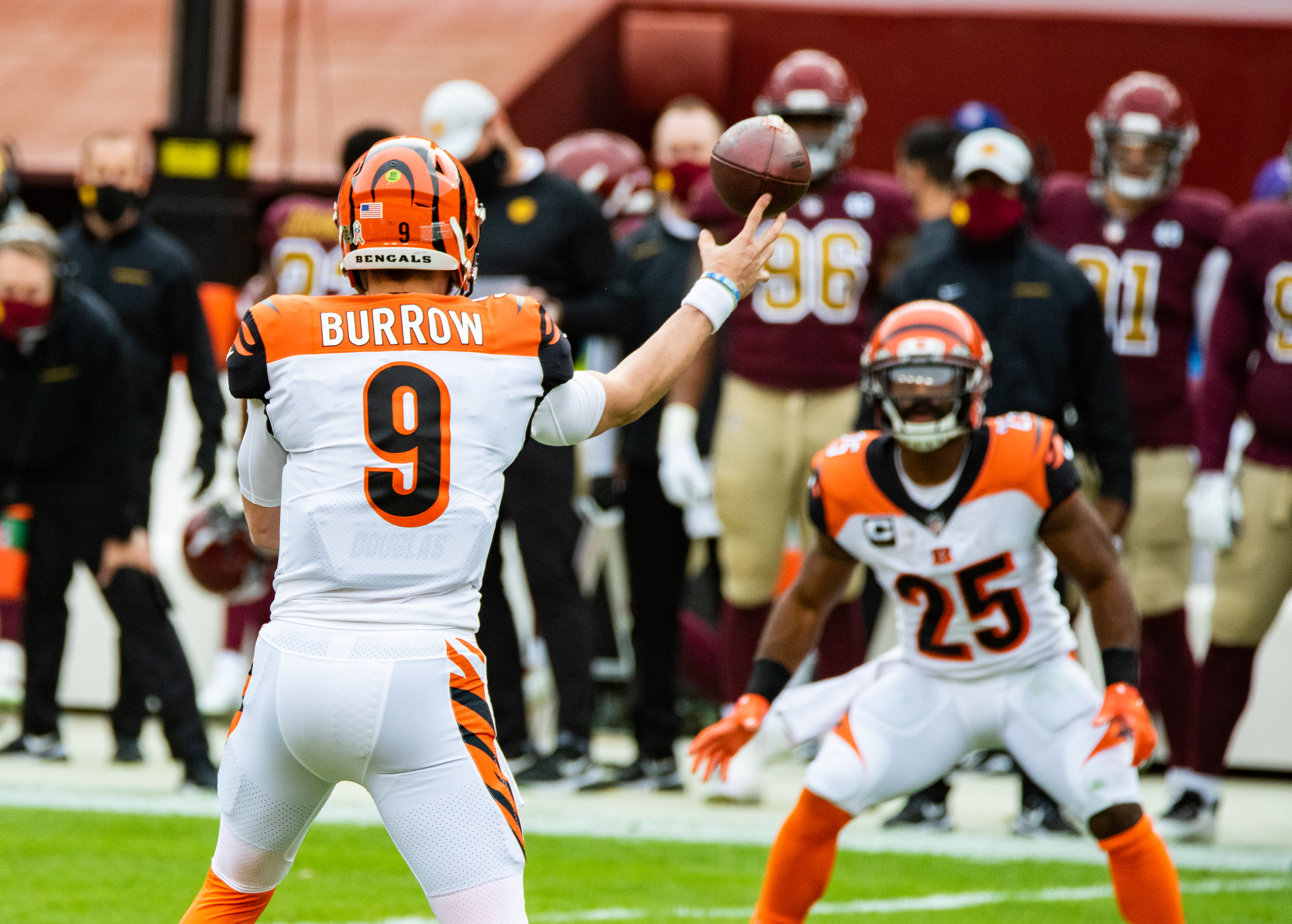
Burrow delivers a pass to Bengals running back Giovani Bernard in November 2020.

Sportswriters have praised Burrow's accuracy, calling his ball placement elite. Brian Callahan, during his tenure as Bengals offensive coordinator, stated that Burrow has "an uncanny ability to place the ball accurately on the move anywhere on the field." Charlie Goldsmith of The Cincinnati Enquirer wrote that Burrow possess elite traits in regards to his "combination of picking up the blitz and his accuracy outside the pocket".

Burrow's pocket management, particularly his movement and footwork within the pocket to help him avoid sacks, has been noted by sportswriters. The Athletic wrote positively of Burrow's "ability to work a broken pocket," stating that Burrow evades defenders and is able to both find space to deliver a throw or run with the ball himself.

=== Intangibles ===
Former New England Patriots running back Kevin Faulk compared Burrow to Tom Brady, noting the former's poise and competitiveness. Once in the NFL, Burrow drew further comparisons to Brady from Chiefs defensive coordinator Steve Spagnuolo.

Burrow's leadership has also been noted by teammates and opponents alike; veteran Mike Daniels spoke on Burrow being voted a team captain as a rookie, stating that Burrow earned the respect of his veteran teammates before even playing. Kansas City Chiefs quarterback Patrick Mahomes has stated "Not only is he a great football player, I think he's a great leader. He has that special knack where he can lead anybody." Mahomes and linebacker Patrick Queen have also noted Burrow's "swag" or "swagger". Indeed, Burrow has been noted by writers for his "cool" demeanor both on and off the field. ProFootballTalk writer Peter King wrote that "Burrow's steely mentality and his right arm are putting him on the path to greatness. I wouldn't bet against him." Burrow's attitude has been attributed as a factor in his ability to remain calm under pressure in-game, earning him the "Joe Cool" and "Joe Brrr" nicknames.

== Flag football ==
In March 2026, Burrow competed in the Fanatics Flag Football Classic as a member of the Wildcats FFC. The event was a round-robin tournament between three teams; Burrow led the team to a victory over Founders FFC, but lost to Team USA in the championship round. Burrow expressed interest in playing for the United States men's national flag football team at the 2028 Summer Olympics.

== Personal life ==
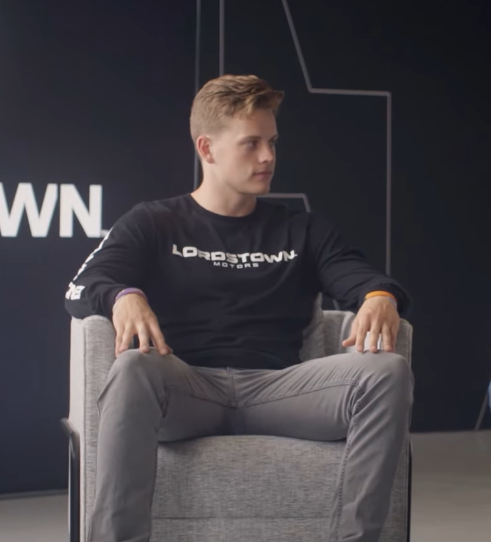
Burrow during an interview with Lordstown Motors in November 2022

Burrow spent one summer during college interning at Goldman Sachs. After signing his rookie contract with the Bengals, Burrow stated that he planned to save all of his contract money and instead live through income received from endorsements.

Burrow is a fan of the Super Smash Bros. video game series. In a 2023 interview, Burrow stated that he usually plays Super Smash Bros. Ultimate on flights to road games with his teammates, and that he frequently plays as Ness from Earthbound.

Burrow is an avid fan of Kid Cudi, often listening to his music prior to Bengals games. In February 2022, Burrow appeared on-stage with Cudi during a Super Bowl afterparty. Later in the year, Cudi included a bonus track named after Burrow on his Entergalactic album.

In January 2023, Burrow was among a coalition of about a dozen athletes, including Blake Griffin and Kevin Gausman, who purchased a 104-acre (42 ha) northern Iowa farm with plans to further acquire a diverse set of agricultural assets.

In 2024, Burrow bought one of the ten replicas of the Batmobile from The Dark Knight film trilogy for $2.9 million to add to his car collection.

=== Political views ===
In the wake of the Roe v. Wade being overturned in June 2022, Burrow spoke out on Instagram in favor of abortion rights in the United States. Following the Uvalde school shooting, Burrow expressed his support for stricter gun control reforms during a press conference.
