= Daniel Gopher =

Israeli cognitive psychologist and ergonomist

- דניאל גופר
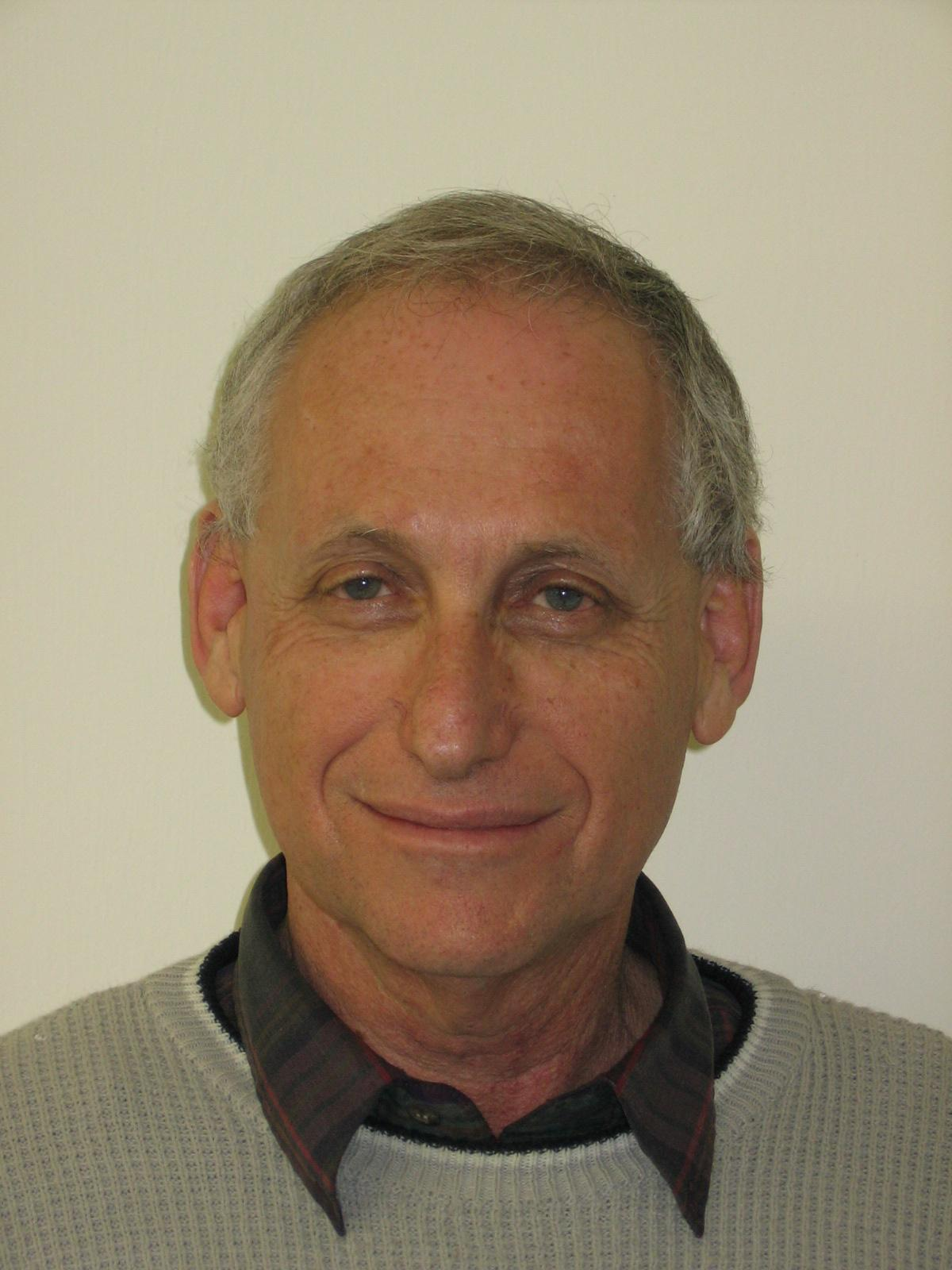
- Born: 29 June 1943 (age 83); Petach-Tikva, Israel
- Education: Hebrew University of Jerusalem
- Awards: Human Factors and Ergonomics Society fellow, Psychonomic Society fellow, International Ergonomics Association fellow
- Scientific career
- Fields: Cognitive psychology Human Factors Engineering
- Workplaces: Technion
- Thesis: Patterns of Eye Movements in Auditory Tasks of Selective Attention (1975)
- Doctoral advisor: Daniel Kahneman

Daniel Gopher (Hebrew: דניאל גופר; born 29 June 1943) is a professor (Emeritus) of Cognitive psychology and Human Factors Engineering at the Faculty of Industrial Engineering and Management, Technion - Israel Institute of Technology. He held the Yigal Alon Chair for the Study of Humans at Work at the Technion. Gopher is a fellow of the Human Factors and Ergonomics Society, the Psychonomic Society and the International Ergonomics Association.

== Early life and education ==
Daniel Gopher was born in Petach-Tikva. He graduated from Brenner high School in 1961. He began his academic studies in Psychology and Sociology at the Hebrew University of Jerusalem in 1961 and received his B.A. in 1965, and M.Sc. in Psychology in 1968. He continued his Ph.D. studies at the Hebrew University until 1972. His thesis on "Patterns of Eye Movements in Auditory Tasks of Selective Attention" was supervised by Prof. Daniel Kahneman. From 1973 to 1975 Gopher had a postdoctoral appointment at the University of Illinois at Urbana-Champaign.

== Israel Defense Forces service ==
Gopher enlisted in the IDF in 1966. He was a senior scientist and acting head of the Research Unit in the Personnel Division (1966-1970), and senior scientist and head of Human Factors of the Air Force (1970-1979).

== Academic career ==
Gopher joined the Faculty of Industrial Engineering and Management at the Technion in 1979 as a Senior Lecturer. He was promoted to Associate Professor in 1981 and to a full Professor in 1989. He held the Yigal Alon Chair for the Study of Human at Work in Technion from 1998 until his retirement as an Emeritus Professor in 2011.

During the years, Gopher held visiting academic positions at other universities and research institutes, including the University of Illinois, Urbana-Champaign; Columbia University; Nanyang University, Singapore; NASA, Man Vehicle Division, Moffett Field, California; the Swinburne University of Technology and Monash University, Melbourne, Australia; University of Montpellier 1, France and Sant'Anna School of Advanced Studies in Pisa, Italy.

Prof. Gopher has held several official positions at the Technion, including Director of the Technion Research Center for Work Safety and Human Engineering, Director of Max Wertheimer Minerva center for cognitive processes and human performance, Coordinator of Graduate Studies, Faculty of Industrial Engineering and Management, member of the Technion Senate Steering Committee and Technion Graduate Studies Committee.

== Research ==
Gopher’s research work combines basic and applied research in Cognitive Psychology and Human Factors Engineering, with emphasis on attention processes, measurement of workload and training of complex skills. In the Israeli Air Force, he has been involved in several major efforts related to system design, as well as the development of training programs and simulators for pilots, air traffic controllers and other aviation-related professions. Gopher also conducted multiple studies and application projects on topics of safety at the work and patient safety in medical systems.

== Professional experience ==
Gopher has held several national and international professional positions. He was founder and president of the Israel Ergonomics Association, Member of the Board of Governors of the National Institute of Safety and Health, Chair of the International Association for the Study of Attention and Performance, Member of the Minerva Centers General Committee, Berlin Germany, Member of the Expert Advisory Committee for Life and Physical Science in Space of the European Space Agency (ESA) and the European Science Foundation (ESF).

Gopher was also an Associate Editor of the European Journal of Cognitive Psychology, and a Member of the Editorial Board at several professional journals: Acta Psychologica, European Journal of Cognitive Psychology, International Journal of Human Computer Interaction, Psychology - Israel Journal of Psychology, Human Factors, Journal of Experimental Psychology: Applied.

From 2005 Gopher serves as a Scientific Advisor to ACE – Applied Cognitive Engineering. Based on Gopher’s research work, the company developed IntelliGym - a video-game-like training platform designed to improve players’ cognitive performance in basketball, Ice hockey and soccer.

== Honors and awards ==
Gopher was the recipient of the Human Factors and Ergonomics Society, Jerome H. Ely award 1995, for the best paper published in Human Factors in 1994. Republished in a book celebrating its 50th anniversary “Best of Human Factors: Thirty classic contributions to Human Factors/Ergonomic Science and Engineering (2008)”.

Together with A. Koriat Gopher received the 1995 German Minerva Foundation endowment grant of 3 million dollars for establishing a joint Technion - Haifa University Research Center for the Study of Cognitive Processes and Human Performance.

Gopher was also elected as Fellow of the Human Factors and Ergonomics Society in 1996, Fellow of the Psychonomics Society in 1998 and Fellow of the International Ergonomics Association in 2000. He was the recipient of the Hal Henrick Distinguished International Colleague Award 2013, for "outstanding contributions to the Human Factors and Ergonomics field" by the Human Factors and Ergonomics Society, U.S.A.

== Publications ==
=== Books ===
- Gopher D. & Koriat A. (Eds). (1999) Attention and Performance XVII: Cognitive Regulation of Performance - Theory and Application. Boston, MIT Press.
- Donchin Y. & Gopher D (2011) Around the Patient Bed: Human Factors and Safety in Health Care. Carta Jerusalem, Israel (Hebrew). An English version has been published in (2013) by Taylor and Francis CRC, Florida US.
- Bergamasco M. Bardy B. Gopher D. (Eds). (2012) Skill Training in Multimodal Virtual Environments. Taylor and Francis CRC Press.

=== Selected articles ===
- Navon, D. and Gopher, D. (1979). "On the economy of the human processing system", Psychological Review, 86, 214-253.
- Gopher, D., Brickner, M. and Navon, D. (1982). "Different difficulty manipulations interact differently with task emphasis: Evidence for multiple resources", Journal Experimental Psychology: Human Perception and Performance, 8, 146-157.
- Gopher, D. (1982). "A selective attention test as a predictor of success in flight training", Human Factors, 24, 173-183.
- Gopher, D. and Braune, R.(1984). "On the psychophysics of workload: Why bother with subjective measures", Human Factors, 26, 519-532.
- Gopher, D. and Donchin, E. (1986). "Workload: An examination of the concept". In K. Boff, and L. Kaufman, (Eds.): Handbook of Human Perception and Performance, New York: John Wiley, Vol II, 41, 1-49.
- Gopher, D., & Raij, D. (1988) "Typing with a two hand chord keyboard - will the QWERTY become obsolete?" IEEE Transactions on System Man and Cybernetics 18, 60l-609
- Gopher, D., Weil, M., & Siegel, D. (1989). "Practice under changing priorities: An approach to training of complex skills". Acta Psychologica, 71, 147-179.
- Gopher, D. (1993). The skill of attention control: Acquisition and execution of attention strategies. In D. Meyer & S. Kornblum (Eds.). Attention and Performance XIV: Synergies in Experimental Psychology, Artificial Intelligence, and Cognitive Neuroscience - A Silver Jubilee. Cambridge, MA: MIT Press.
- Gopher, D., Weil, M., & Bareket, T. (1994). Transfer of skill from a computer game trainer to flight. Human Factors, 36, 1-19.
- Donchin, Y., Gopher, D., Olin, M., Badihi, Y., Beisky, M., Sprung, C., & Kotev.(1995). The Nature and Causes of Human Error in the Intensive Care Unit. Critical Care Medicine. 23, pp 294–300
- Gopher D., Armony L., Greenshpan Y. (2000). Switching tasks and attention policies. Journal of Experimental Psychology: General. 109, pp 306–339.
- ani, C., Gopher, D., Lavie, P. (2004). Peripheral vasoconstriction reflects exerted mental effort. Psychophysiology, 41, pp 789–798.
- Gopher D. (2006). Control processes in the formation of task units. In: Qicheng Jing (Ed.): Psychological Science around the World, Volume 2, Social and Applied Issues. Oxford Psychology Press. A chapter based on a keynote address given at the 28th International Congress of Psychology
- Bonder T and Gopher D (2019), The Effect of Confidence Rating on a Primary Visual Task Frontiers in Psychology. 10:267 doi: 10.3389/fpsyg.2019.02674

=== Patent ===
- Chordic Keyboard System, Gopher, Hilburn & Wickner U.S. Patent 5,493,654 Feb. 20, 1996.

== Personal life ==
Gopher is married to Esther Houmash. They have four children and live in Kiryat Tiv'on.
