= IntelliGym =

- Genre: Serious game
- Developer: ACE Applied Cognitive Engineering Ltd

IntelliGym is a video-game-like training program designed to improve cognitive performance of competitive athletes. Due to its content and delivery methodology, it is considered a serious game. However, unlike many serious games, the IntelliGym uses a low-fidelity training approach which is based on a 'cognitive simulation' patented technology. Current release is available for basketball players (dubbed The Basketball IntelliGym), hockey players (The Hockey IntelliGym, developed in conjunction with USA Hockey) and soccer players (dubbed The Football IntelliGym).

According to its creators, IntelliGym addresses a broad range of cognitive skills, such as perception, anticipation, decision making under pressure, spatial awareness and pattern recognition.

== History ==
According to the official website, the IntelliGym technology is based on a concept originally developed for Israeli Air Force pilots. The research was conducted by Professor Daniel Gopher of the Technion, Israel, following a DARPA project reviewing the cognitive training system called the Space Fortress. This study showed significant improvement in performance of trainees after using a specially designed computer game, compared to a control group. Following the introduction of the basketball application NCAA Division-I basketball teams (including Kentucky, Memphis, Florida and Kansas) as well as high school varsity teams adopted the IntelliGym as a training tool for their players. Coaches have reported significant improvement in performance of trainees, as shown by their statistical measures.

=== Scientific Background ===
The IntelliGym is based on the notion of “Low Fidelity Simulation”: the game stimulates exactly the same cognitive skill-set that is required to play basketball, but without the visual resemblance. This way, the player is required to make meaningful choices with respect to making the right game decisions, but without the negative artifacts of a high-fidelity simulation found in research.

== The Basketball IntelliGym ==
The Basketball IntelliGym
- Developer: ACE Applied Cognitive Engineering Ltd.
- Platform: Windows
- Release: 2005
- Genre: Serious game
- Mode: Single-player

A Basketball IntelliGym sample scenario

=== Gameplay ===
The Basketball IntelliGym presents the player with situations where rapid decisions are needed to be made. The game takes place in a space-like environment, and includes different scenarios. In its main training settings, two teams of five spaceships on each team are competing. Using various weapons and ammunition types loaded on a ‘Super Cannon’, a player can either steal points from its rival team or prevent the opponent from gaining points. The game consists of a given number of training sessions (19 sessions on the basic version and 34 on the premium release), each taking approximately 30 minutes to complete. The difficulty level is adjusted to the individual performance of the player.

=== Availability ===
The Basketball IntelliGym was originally provided on a CD, with 2 versions for Microsoft Windows. On 2009, a downloadable version has been released and replaced the CD. The program requires Internet connection for initial registration, but thereafter can be played offline.

=== Reception ===
The game has been reported by mainstream media sources such as ESPN, Fox News, the LAB, primarily when leading NCAA Division-I teams have started to use it. The official site lists some 20 teams that are using the product but fails to provide the number of individual users.

== The Hockey IntelliGym ==
The Hockey IntelliGym
- Developer: ACE Applied Cognitive Engineering Ltd.
- Platforms: PC: Windows, Mac
- Release: 2010
- Genre: Serious game
- Mode: Single-player

Hockey IntelliGym Training Environment

In June 2009, USA Hockey and Applied Cognitive Engineering Ltd. announced a collaborative development of a training system for ice hockey players. The research and development was funded by Bird Foundation (the research and development fund operated by the US and Israeli governments). The program was released in 2010. The Hockey IntelliGym is used extensively by players of the USA Under-17, Under-18 and Under-20 Ice Hockey national teams.
Research conducted at the USA Hockey National Team Development Program demonstrated that the IntelliGym reduced the number of on ice injuries. The developers of the program claim that enhanced cognitive skills, and in particular spatial awareness, anticipation and working memory, allow players to avoid hazardous positions.
In March 2013, the Hockey IntelliGym has been adopted by the players' development initiative of USA Hockey (known as the American Development Model, or the ADM).
In May 2014, the Mayo Clinic adopted the IntelliGym as a training tool to all hockey players attending Mayo's Sports Medical Center.

=== Availability ===
The Hockey IntelliGym is available as a downloadable program for personal computer platform (Windows-based or Mac). The program requires Internet connection for activation. The program is offered to both teams and individual players.

=== Reception ===
According to USA Hockey, the Hockey IntelliGym is widely used among ice-hockey players in the US. Various ice-hockey reporters published positive reviews about the program and its efficacy.

== The Soccer IntelliGym ==
The Soccer IntelliGym
- Developer: ACE Applied Cognitive Engineering Ltd.
- Platforms: PC: Windows, Mac
- Release: 2017
- Genre: Serious game
- Mode: Single-player

Football IntelliGym Training Environment

In May 2015, after receiving a grant from the EU Horizon 2020 program, Applied Cognitive Engineering Ltd. announced a 24-months project dedicated to the development of a cognitive training program for soccer players. The project was titled "BrainPEER" ("Brain Performance Enhancement Revolution") and involved 10 European football clubs and 2 research universities.

Two efficacy studies were conducted to measure the impact of IntelliGym training on actual soccer performance. The studies were conducted at the Vrije Universiteit Amsterdam (led by Prof. Geert Savelsbergh) and the German Sport University Cologne (led by Prof. Daniel Memmert). Both studies showed significant improvement of on-field performance of IntelliGym trainees compared to the control group.

=== Availability ===
The Soccer IntelliGym is available as a downloadable program for personal computer platform (Windows-based or Mac). The program requires Internet connection for activation. The program is offered to both teams and individual players.

=== Reception ===
The game has been reported by mainstream media sources such as the New York Times, Bild and Sports Illustrated. According to the company's website, as of August 2017, there are over 36,000 users, and ten professional football clubs who use the program.

== See also ==
- Serious game
- Simulation video game
- Game based learning
