= Human Performance (journal) =

- Discipline: Applied psychology, industrial and organizational psychology
- Language: English
- Edited by: Sylvia G. Roch

Publication details
- History: 1988-present
- Publisher: Taylor & Francis
- Frequency: Quarterly
- Impact factor: 1.302 (2016)

Standard abbreviations
- ISO 4: Hum. Perform.

Indexing
- ISSN: 0895-9285 (print); 1532-7043 (web)
- LCCN: 98657432
- OCLC no.: 896849769

Links
- Journal homepage; Online access; Online archive

Human Performance is a quarterly peer-reviewed scientific journal covering industrial and organizational psychology as it relates to job performance. It was established in 1988, with Frank Landy (Pennsylvania State University) as its founding editor-in-chief. It is published by Taylor & Francis and the current editor-in-chief is Sylvia G. Roch (University at Albany, SUNY). According to the Journal Citation Reports, the journal has a 2016 impact factor of 1.302, ranking it 49th out of 80 journals in the category "Psychology, Applied".
